= Simon Kuznets =

American economist and statistician (1901–1985)

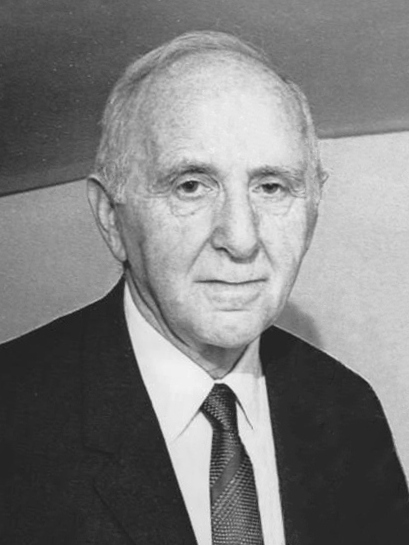
- Kuznets in 1971
- Born: April 30, 1901; Pinsk, Russian Empire
- Died: July 8, 1985 (aged 84); Cambridge, Massachusetts, U.S.
- Burial place: Sharon Memorial Park
- Citizenship: United States

Academic background
- Education: Kharkov Institute of Commerce; Columbia University (BS, MA, PhD)
- Doctoral advisor: Wesley Clair Mitchell

Academic work
- Discipline: Econometrics, development economics
- School or tradition: Institutional economics
- Institutions: NBER; Columbia University, Harvard University (1960–1971); Johns Hopkins University (1954–1960); University of Pennsylvania (1930–1954)
- Doctoral students: Baidyanath Misra; Milton Friedman; Richard Easterlin; Stanley Engerman; Robert Fogel; Subramanian Swamy; Lance Taylor
- Awards: Nobel Memorial Prize in Economic Sciences (1971)
- Website: Information at IDEAS / RePEc

Simon Smith Kuznets (/ˈkʌznɛts/ KUZ-nets; Russian: Семён Абра́мович Кузне́ц, romanized: Semyon Abramovich Kuznets, IPA: [sʲɪˈmʲɵn ɐˈbraməvʲɪtɕ kʊzʲˈnʲets]; April 30, 1901 – July 8, 1985) was a Russian-born American economist and statistician. He received the 1971 Nobel Memorial Prize in Economic Sciences "for his empirically founded interpretation of economic growth which has led to new and deepened insight into the economic and social structure and process of development."

Kuznets made a decisive contribution to the transformation of economics into an empirical science and to the formation of quantitative economic history. Kuznets pioneered the concept of gross domestic product, which seeks to capture all economic production in a state by a single measure.

== Biography ==
=== Early life ===
Simon Kuznets was born on April 30, 1901, in Pinsk, the capital of Pinsky Uyezd in Minsk Governorate of the Russian Empire (present-day Belarus), to a Jewish family. He had two brothers, Solomon and George. He completed his schooling, first at the Realschule in Rovno and then Kharkov (present-day Ukraine). In 1918, Kuznets entered the Kharkov Institute of Commerce, where he studied economic sciences, statistics, history and mathematics under the guidance of professors P. Fomin (political economy), A. Antsiferov (statistics), V. Levitsky (economic history and economic thought), S. Bernstein (probability theory), V. Davats (mathematics), and others. Basic academic courses at the Institute helped him to acquire "exceptional" erudition in economics, as well as in history, demography, statistics and natural sciences. According to the institute's curriculum, development of national economies had to be analyzed in the wider context of changes in "connected spheres" and with the involvement of proper methods and empirical data. There, he began to study economics, and became exposed to Joseph Schumpeter's theory of innovation and the business cycle.

At the turn of the decade, the normal work in the institute was interrupted by the events of the Russian Civil War; reorganizations were undertaken by the Soviet authorities in the sphere of the higher education. There is no precise information whether Kuznets continued his studies at the institute, but it is known that he joined the Department of Labor of UZHBURO (South Bureau) of the Central Council of Trade Unions. There, he published his first scientific paper, "Monetary wages and salaries of factory workers in Kharkov in 1920"; he explored the dynamics of different types of wages by industries in Kharkov and income differentiation, depending on the wage system.

=== Emigration to the United States ===
In 1922, the Kuznets family emigrated to the United States. Kuznets then studied at Columbia University under the guidance of Wesley Clair Mitchell. He graduated with a B.S. in 1923, M.A. in 1924, and Ph.D. in 1926. As his magister thesis, he defended his essay "Economic system of Dr. Schumpeter, presented and analyzed", written in Kharkov. From 1925 to 1926, Kuznets spent time studying economic patterns in prices as the Research Fellow at the Social Science Research Council. It was this work that led to his book "Secular Movements in Production and Prices", defended as a doctoral thesis and published in 1930.

In 1927, he became a member of the research staff of the National Bureau of Economic Research (NBER), where he worked until 1961. From 1931 until 1936, Kuznets was a part-time professor at the University of Pennsylvania. In 1937 he was elected as a fellow of the American Statistical Association. He was elected to the Pi Gamma Mu social science honor society chapter at the University of Pennsylvania and actively served as a chapter officer in the 1940s; becoming a full-time professor from 1936 until 1954. In 1954, Kuznets moved to Johns Hopkins University, where he was professor of political economy until 1960. From 1961 until his retirement in 1970, Kuznets taught at Harvard.

Apart from that, Kuznets collaborated with a number of research organizations and government agencies. From 1931 to 1934, at Mitchell's behest, Kuznets took charge of the NBER's work on U.S. national income accounts, giving the first official estimation of the US national income. In 1936, Kuznets took the lead in establishing the Conference on Research, Income and Wealth, which brought together government officials and academic economists, engaged in the development of the U.S. national income and product accounts, and in 1947 helped to establish its international counterpart, the International Association for Research in Income and Wealth.

During the Second World War, between 1942 and 1944, Kuznets became the associate director of the Bureau of Planning and Statistics of the War Production Board. He took part in work to assess the country's capacity to expand military production. Researchers used national income accounting, together with a rough form of linear programming, to measure the potential for increased production and the resources from which it would come, and to identify the materials that were binding constraints on expansion.

After the war, he worked as an advisor for the governments of China, Japan, India, Korea, Taiwan, and Israel in the establishment of their national systems of economic information. Kuznets cooperated with the Growth Center of Yale University, the Social Science Research Council (SSRC). He guided extensive research, holding a number of positions in research institutions, such as the Chairman of the Falk Project for Economic Research in Israel, 1953–1963; member of the board of trustees and honorary chairman, Maurice Falk Institute for Economic Research in Israel, from 1963; and chairman, Social Science Research Council Committee on the Economy of China, 1961–1970.

Kuznets was elected as the President of the American Economic Association (1954), President of the American Statistical Association (1949), an honorable member of the Association of Economic History, the Royal Statistical Society of England and a member of the Econometric Society, the International Statistical Institute, the American Philosophical Society, the Royal Swedish Academy and a corresponding member of the British Academy. He was awarded the Medal of Francis Walker (1977).

Kuznets died on July 8, 1985, at the age of 84.

== Legacy ==
In 2013, the Kharkiv National University of Economics was renamed as the Simon Kuznets Kharkiv National University of Economics.

=== Impact on economics ===
His name is associated with the formation of modern economic science as an empirical discipline, the development of statistical methods of research and the emergence of quantitative economic history. Kuznets is credited with revolutionising econometrics, and this work is credited with fueling the so-called Keynesian revolution.

Kuznets' views and scientific methodology were highly influenced by methodological settings received by him in Kharkiv and fully shared by Mitchell for the statistical, inductive construction of hypotheses in economics and its empirical testing. Kuznets treated a priori and speculative conceptions with deep skepticism. At the same time, Kuznets tended to analyze economy in connection with the wider context of historical situation, demographic, and social processes, a method that was peculiar to the Kharkiv academics at the beginning of the 20th century. Kuznets was influenced by the work of such leading theorists as Joseph A. Schumpeter (who probed the relationship between technological change and business cycles), A. C. Pigou (who identified circumstances under which markets failed to maximize economic welfare), and Vilfredo Pareto (who propounded a law governing the distribution of income among households). Kuznets was closely familiar with the economics of Russia and Ukraine of the early 20th century. In the 1920s, he reviewed and translated the papers of Kondratiev, Slutsky, Pervushin, Weinstein. who were then little known in the West.

==== Historical series of economic dynamics and Kuznets cycles, or "long swings" ====
The first major research project in which Kuznets was involved was the study of long series of economic dynamics in the US undertaken in the mid-1920s. The collected data covered the period from 1865 to 1925, and for some indices achieved 1770. Applying for the analysis of time series approximating Gompertz and logistic curves, Kuznets found that the characteristics of the curves with reasonable accuracy described the majority of economic processes. Fitting trend curves to data and analysis of the time series, comparison of theoretical and empirical levels, allowed him to identify medium-term extended cycles of economic activity, which lasted 15–25 years and had an intermediate position between the Kondratyev "long waves" and short business cycles. Aspiring to determine the nature of these cycles, Kuznets analyzed the dynamics of population, the construction industry performance, capital, national income data and other variables. These movements became known among economists and economic historians as "Kuznets cycles", and alternatively as "long swings" in the economy's growth rate (following the work of Moses Abramovitz [1912–1999]).

==== National income accounts ====
In 1931, at Mitchell's behest, Kuznets took charge of the NBER's work on U.S. national income accounts. In 1934, an assessment of the national income of the United States for the period 1929–1932 was given; further, it was extended to 1919–1938, and then, until 1869. Although Kuznets was not the first economist to try this, his work was so comprehensive and meticulous that it set the standard in the field. (He explicitly notes his work as an update of W.I. King's 1930 "The National income and Its Purchasing Power" in https://www.nber.org/system/files/chapters/c4231/c4231.pdf, as well as the contribution of Lillian Epstein, Elizabeth Jenks, and Edna Ehrenberg, the first of which had also contributed to King's 1930 book.)

Kuznets had success to solve numerous problems ranging from lack of sources of information and bias assessments, to the development of the theoretical concept of national income. Kuznets achieved a high precision in calculations. His works allowed us to analyze the structure of the national income, and expose to detailed study a number of specific problems of the national economy. Improved methods for calculating the national income and related indicators have become classics and formed the basis of the modern system of national accounts. Having analyzed the distribution of income among different social groups, Kuznets put forward the hypothesis that in countries, which were on the early stages of economic development, income inequality increased first, but as far as national economy was growing, it tended to decrease. This assumption formed the basis of so-called "Kuznets curve" empirical conception.

Kuznets helped the U.S. Department of Commerce to standardize the measurement of GNP. He disapproved, however, of its use as a general indication of welfare, writing that "the welfare of a nation can scarcely be inferred from a measure of national income."

Exploring the formation of the national income, Kuznets studied proportions between output and income, consumption and savings, etc. After analyzing the long-term data sets of economic conditions for 20 countries, Kuznets revealed long-term trends in capital / output ratios, shares of net capital formation, net investment, and so on. Collected and systematized data allowed exposing to empirical testing a number of existing hypotheses. In particular, this concerned premises of the Keynes theory – Keynes' 1936 absolute income hypothesis.

The hypothesis gave birth to what would become the first formal consumption function. However, Kuznets shook the economic world by finding that Keynes' predictions, while seemingly accurate in short-run cross-sections, broke down under more rigorous examination. In his 1942 tome Uses of National Income in Peace and War, published by the National Bureau of Economic Research, Kuznets became the first economist to show that the Absolute Income Hypothesis gives inaccurate predictions in the long run (by using time-series data). Keynes had predicted that as aggregate income increases, so will marginal savings. Kuznets used new data to show that, over a longer span of time (1870s – 1940s) the savings ratio remained constant, despite large changes in income. This paved the way for Milton Friedman's permanent income hypothesis, and several more modern alternatives such as the life-cycle hypothesis and the relative income hypothesis.

==== Economic growth ====
By the end of the Second World War Kuznets moved into a new research area, related to the tie between changes in income and growth. He proposed a research program that involved extensive empirical studies on the four key elements of economic growth. The elements were demographic growth, growth of knowledge, in-country adaptation to growth factors, and external economic relations between the countries. The general theory of economic growth should explain the development of advanced industrial countries, and the reasons that prevent the development of backward countries, include both market and planned economies, large and small, developed and developing countries, consider the impact on growth of foreign economic relations.

He collected and analyzed statistical indicators of economic performance of 14 countries in Europe, the U.S. and Japan for 60 years. Analysis of the materials led to the advancement of a number of hypotheses relating to various aspects of the mechanism of economic growth, concerning the level and variability of growth, structure of the GNP and distribution of labor, the distribution of income between households, the structure of foreign trade. Kuznets founded the historically grounded theory of economic growth. The central theme of these empirical studies is that the growth of the aggregated product of the country necessarily implies a profound transformation of the whole of its economic structure. This transformation affects many aspects of economic life – the structure of production, sectoral and occupational structure of employment, the division of occupations among family and market activities, the income structure, size, age structure and spatial distribution of the population, cross-country flows of goods, capital, labor and knowledge, the organization of industry and governmental regulation. Such changes, in his opinion, are essential for overall growth and, once started, shape, constrain or support the subsequent economic development of the country. Kuznets made a profound analysis of the impact on economic growth by demographic processes and characteristics.

His major thesis, which argued that underdeveloped countries of today possess characteristics different from those that industrialized countries faced before they developed, helped put an end to the simplistic view that all countries went through the same "linear stages" in their history and launched the separate field of development economics – which now focused on the analysis of modern underdeveloped countries' distinct experiences.

== Kuznets curve ==
Among his several observations which sparked important theoretical research programs was the Kuznets curve, an inverted U-shaped relation between income inequality and economic growth (1955, 1963). In poor countries, economic growth increased the income disparity between rich and poor people. In wealthier countries, economic growth narrowed the difference. By noting patterns of income inequality in developed and underdeveloped countries, he proposed that as countries experienced economic growth, the income inequality first increases and then decreases. The reasoning was that in order to experience growth, countries had to shift from agricultural to industrial sectors. While there was little variation in the agricultural income, industrialization led to large differences in income. Additionally, as economies experienced growth, mass education provided greater opportunities which decreased the inequality and the lower income portion of the population gained political power to change governmental policies. He also discovered the patterns in savings-income behavior which launched the life-cycle-permanent-income hypothesis of Modigliani and Friedman. He conducted his research for many years and finally published his findings in 1963.

=== Historical and economic works of the 1970s ===
In his historical and economic studies of the 1970s, Kuznets expressed the idea of an interaction between science and technology (innovations), and institutional shifts, as well as the role of factors external to the economy, such as those caused by the moral and political climate in society, and their impact on the progress and results of economic growth.

== Selected publications ==
- "Secular Movements in Production and Prices: Their Nature and Their Bearing upon Cyclical Fluctuations". (New York and Boston: Houghton Mifflin, 1930).
- "National Income and Capital Formation, 1919–1935". (1937)
- "National Income and Its Composition, 1919–1938". (1941) Assisted by Lillian Epstein and Elizabeth Jenks https://www.nber.org/chapters/c4224
- "Economic Growth and Income Inequality". American Economic Review 45 (March): 1–28. (1955)
- "Quantitative aspects of the economic growth of nations, VIII: The distribution of income by size", Economic Development and Cultural Change, 11, pp. 1–92. (1963)
- "Modern Economic Growth: Rate, Structure, and Spread". (1966)
- "Toward a Theory of Economic Growth, with Reflections on the Economic Growth of Modern Nations". (1968)
- "Economic Growth of Nations: Total Output and Production Structure". (1971)
- "Population, Capital and Growth". (1973)

== See also ==
- Capital formation
- Gross domestic product
- Information Revolution
- List of economists
- List of Jewish Nobel laureates

== Sources ==
- Sherby, Louise S. (2002). "Kuznets, Simon Smith". The Who's Who of Nobel Prize Winners, 1901-2000. Bloomsbury Academic. p. 52. ISBN 978-1-57356-414-4.

Awards
Preceded by Paul A. Samuelson	Laureate of the Nobel Memorial Prize in Economics; 1971	Succeeded by John R. Hicks; Kenneth J. Arrow
