= Precautionary savings =

Precautionary saving is saving (non-expenditure of a portion of income) that occurs in response to uncertainty regarding future income. The precautionary motive to delay consumption and save in the current period rises due to the lack of completeness of insurance markets. Accordingly, individuals will not be able to insure against some bad state of the economy in the future. They anticipate that if this bad state is realized, they will earn lower income. To avoid adverse effects of future income fluctuations and retain a smooth path of consumption, they set aside a precautionary reserve, called precautionary savings, by consuming less in the current period, and resort to it in case the bad state is realized in the future.

== Basic concept ==
Economists have realized significance of precautionary saving long ago. Historically, the precautionary motive for saving has been recognized by economists since before the time of John Maynard Keynes. Moreover, Alfred Marshal stressed the importance of saving to secure against future risks: "The thriftlessness of early times was in great measure due to the want of security that those who made provision for the future would enjoy it".

Defining this concept, individuals save out of their current income to smooth the expected consumption stream over time. The impact of the precautionary saving is realized through its impact on current consumption, as individuals defer their current consumption to be able to maintain the utility level of consumption in the future if income drops.

Some examples of events that create the need for precautionary saving include health risk, business risk, unavoidable expenditures, and risk of labor income change, saving for retirement and a child's education.

Precautionary savings are intimately associated with investments, if earnings are not used for purchasing commodities and services; there is a probability that the precautionary savings can be invested to generate fixed capital and achieve economic growth.

Precautionary saving is different from precautionary savings. Saving is a flow variable quantity, measured in units of currency per unit of time (such as dollars per year). Conversely, the savings denotes the accumulated stock of funds that is present at a single point of time.

A higher rate of precautionary saving would lead to a higher growth in an individual's net worth.

== Precautionary saving and life cycle: the Permanent Income Hypothesis ==
An individual's level of precautionary saving is modeled as being determined by the utility maximization problem.

This was realized by Friedman (1957), and later by Ando and Modigliani (1963) and Bewley (1977) in their seminal work on the permanent income hypothesis (PIH).

The relevance of the life-cycle framework, therefore, builds on intertemporal allocation of resources between the present and an uncertain future with the goal of maximizing utility. Rational individuals take sequential decisions to achieve a coherent and ‘stable’ future goal using currently available information.

Weil (1993) proposed a simple multi-period model to analyze the determinants of precautionary saving. Analytical findings confirmed the presence of a precautionary saving motive, with precautionary saving positively correlated with income risk. More extensive research has confirmed the presence of a precautionary motive for saving within the permanent income hypothesis framework.

== Uncertainty ==
=== Theoretical motivation ===
Leland (1968) introduced a simple analytical framework that builds on the prudence individuals towards risk. This is a concept that economists define as decreasing absolute risk aversion risk aversion with a convex marginal utility (U"' >0). Leland proved that, even for small variations of future income, the precautionary demand for saving exists.

It was only recently that economists confirmed the early findings of Leland. Lusardi (1998) confirmed that intuitions derived from economic models without a precautionary motive could be seriously misleading, even with small uncertainty.

A more developed analytical framework would consider the impact of income risk and capital risk on precautionary savings. Increased savings in the current period raises the expected value of future consumption. Hence the consumer reacts to increased income riskiness by raising level of saving.

Yet increases in saving will also increase the variability (variance) of future consumption. This in turn gives rise to two conflicting tendencies of income and substitution effects. Higher capital risk makes the consumer less inclined to expose his resources to the possibility of future loss; this imposes a positive substitution effect on consumption (i.e. substitute acquiring capital in the current period with consuming in the future to avoid capital loss in the future due to capital risk). This is met with an opposite force, as higher riskiness makes it necessary to save more in order to protect oneself against very low levels of future consumption. This explains the negative income effect on consumption.

A step forward was led by Kimball (1990) who defined the characteristic of "prudence". The measure of absolute prudence was defined as q =-U'"/U", and the index of relative prudence as p=-wU"'/U" (i.e. U is a utility function). The prudence index measures the intensity of the precautionary motive just as risk aversion measures the intensity of the desire for insurance.

=== Empirical literature ===
The empirical literature shows mixed evidence on the significance of the precautionary motive for saving. Numerical simulations suggested the possibility precautionary saving, ranging from 20 to 60 percent of all saving. A significant empirical contribution by Brumberg (1956), showed that savings in the current period were seen statistically significant to bridge the gap between current income and the highest previously earned income. Hence, saving was considered a significant hedge against the income fluctuations.

An attempt to quantify the impact of idiosyncratic risk on saving was led by Aiyagari (1994). Insurance market incompleteness was introduced by assuming a large number of individuals who receive idiosyncratic labor income shocks that are uninsured. This model allows for the individuals’ time preference rate to differ from the markets’ interest rate. Findings of the model showed that lower variability of earnings led to a lower saving rate. Also, the saving rate became higher by a range of 7% to 14% as variability of earnings increased.

The analysis also accounted for the case where market interest rate was higher than the subjective rate of time preference, and provided evidence that individuals will postpone consumption and save by accumulating large stocks of assets. When both rates were equal, given an anticipated shock to the labor income, a rational individual would hold a large stock of assets to hedge for the income risk. The paper also shows analytically that when the interest rate is lower than the time preference rate, individuals would accumulate savings.

Dardanoni (1991) proposed that high rates of precautionary saving would simply be implausible, as most saving should come from the top percentiles of the income distribution—i.e., individuals who are not very likely to engage in precautionary saving. Browning and Lusardi (1996) concluded based on the empirical literature that while the precautionary motive is important for some people at some times, it is unlikely to be so for most people. In other words, the heterogeneity of consumption/saving behavior of individuals in the economy makes it difficult to precisely quantify the precautionary motive for saving.

Moreover, insuring industrial workers’ future incomes against workplace accident was used to test the effect of insurance on precautionary savings. This was conducted for 7000 households who did not or could not obtain complete insurance coverage against workplace accident risk, covering 1917-1919. Industrial workers at the time significantly reduced their saving and insurance consumption by approximately 25 percent when their expected post accident benefits increased.

Subsequent analysis from Kazarosian (1997), using data from the National Longitudinal Survey, has shown that a doubling of uncertainty increases the ratio of wealth to permanent income by 29%. In addition, surveys have shown that most Americans desire precautionary savings at 8% of total net worth and 20% of total financial wealth.

Because of higher quality data on hours worked, a new literature considered precautionary labor supply, a part of precautionary savings. The findings support modest precautionary saving, which is particularly relevant for self-employed. If the self-employed faced the same wage risk as the civil servants, their hours of work would be reduced by 4.5%.

== Macroeconomic context ==
Empirical work has mostly focused on the representative individual’s determinants of precautionary saving. More recent work focused on the importance of the time dimension. Under this notion, uncertainty about households' anticipated future income, due to expected unemployment, strengthens the precautionary motive for saving and hence holds down consumption spending (cetrus paribus). This in turn justifies the notion that precautionary saving may be part of the explanation of why large consumption falls anticipate large increases in unemployment in response to exogenous shocks to the economy.

In the context of business cycles, Challe and Ragot (2010) showed that shocks to labor productivity affect firms' incentives to create jobs and hence the expected duration of unemployment spells. When employed workers are imperfectly insured against the occurrence of such spells, they hoard assets for self-insurance purposes. Moreover, during times of recession the precautionary motive for holding wealth is strengthened, causing aggregate saving to rise and aggregate consumption to fall, which in turn affects the propagation of shocks in the economy.

Not only do individuals accumulate reserves for precautionary purposes, but also sovereigns follow the same behavior. Saving rates of fast-growing emerging economies have been rising over time, leading to surprising “upstream” flows of capital from developing to rich countries. Carroll and Jeanne (2009) developed a model to test the relationship between economic development, the stock of savings and capital flows. The model was able to confirm the precautionary motive of sovereigns' accumulated assets (as a ratio to GDP) in response to risks of global imbalances.
