= Ricardian equivalence =

Hypothesis on the equivalence of tax vs. debt financing

The Ricardian equivalence proposition (also known as the Ricardo–de Viti–Barro equivalence theorem) is an economic hypothesis holding that consumers are forward-looking and so internalize the government's budget constraint when making their consumption decisions. This leads to the result that, for a given pattern of government spending, the method of financing such spending does not affect agents' consumption decisions, and thus, it does not change aggregate demand.

== Introduction ==
Governments can finance their expenditures by creating new money, by levying taxes, or by issuing bonds. Since bonds are loans, they must eventually be repaid—presumably by raising taxes in the future. The choice is therefore "tax now or tax later."

Suppose that the government finances some extra spending through deficits; i.e. it chooses to tax later. According to the hypothesis, taxpayers will anticipate that they will have to pay higher taxes in the future. As a result, they will save, rather than spend, the extra disposable income from the initial tax cut, leaving demand and output unchanged.

David Ricardo was the first to propose this possibility in the early nineteenth century; however, he was unconvinced of its empirical relevance. Antonio de Viti de Marco elaborated on Ricardian equivalence in the 1890s. Robert J. Barro took the question up independently in the 1970s, in an attempt to give the proposition a firm theoretical foundation.

== Ricardo and war bonds ==
In "Essay on the Funding System" (1820), Ricardo studied whether it makes a difference to finance a war with £20 million in current taxes or to issue government bonds with infinite maturity and annual interest payment of £1 million in all following years financed by future taxes. At the assumed interest rate of 5%, Ricardo concluded that in terms of spending the two alternatives amounted to the same value. However, Ricardo himself doubted that this proposition had practical consequences. He followed up the initial exposition with a claim that individuals do not actually evaluate taxes in such a manner and, in particular, take a myopic view of the tax path.

== Ricardo–de Viti–Barro equivalence ==
In 1974, Robert J. Barro provided some theoretical foundation for Ricardo's hesitant speculation (apparently in ignorance of Ricardo's earlier notion and de Viti's subsequent extensions). Barro's model assumed the following:

- families act as infinitely lived dynasties because of intergenerational altruism
- capital markets are perfect (i.e., all can borrow and lend at a single rate)
- the path of government expenditures is fixed

Under these conditions, if governments finance deficits by issuing bonds, the bequests that families grant to their children will be just large enough to offset the higher taxes that will be needed to pay off those bonds. Among his conclusions, Barro wrote:

... in the case where the marginal net-wealth effect of government bonds is close to zero ... fiscal effects involving changes in the relative amounts of tax and debt finance for a given amount of public expenditure would have no effect on aggregate demand, interest rates, and capital formation.

The model was an important contribution to the theory of new classical macroeconomics, built around the assumption of rational expectations.

In 1979, Barro defined the Ricardian equivalence theorem as follows: "... shifts between debt and tax finance for a given amount of public expenditure would have no first-order effect on the real interest rate, volume of private investment, etc." Barro noted that "the Ricardian equivalence proposition is presented in Ricardo". However, Ricardo himself was skeptical of this equivalence.

== Criticisms ==
Ricardian equivalence requires assumptions that have been seriously challenged. The perfect capital market hypothesis is often held up for particular criticism because liquidity constraints invalidate the assumed lifetime income hypothesis. International capital markets also complicate the picture. However, even in a laboratory setting where all assumptions required are ensured to hold, behaviour of individuals is inconsistent with Ricardian equivalence.

Martin Feldstein argued in 1976 that Barro ignored economic and population growth. He demonstrated that the creation of public debt depresses savings in a growing economy. In the same issue James M. Buchanan also criticized Barro's model, noting that "[t]his is an age-old question in public finance theory", one already mooted by Ricardo and elaborated upon by de Viti.

In a response to the comments of Feldstein and Buchanan, Barro recognized that uncertainty may play a role in affecting individual behaviour with respect to government finance. Nevertheless, he argued that "it is much less clear that this complication would imply systematic errors in a direction such that public debt issue raises aggregate demand."

In 1977, Gerald P. O'Driscoll commented that Ricardo, in expanding his treatment of this subject for an Encyclopædia Britannica article, changed so many features of it as to result in a Ricardian Nonequivalence Theorem; he elaborated all the reasons why the proposition would not hold.

In 1989, Barro offered a number of defenses against various other critiques.

== Empirical results ==
Ricardian equivalence has been the subject of extensive empirical inquiry. Barro himself found some confirmation in post WW I years.

However, research by Chris Carroll, James Poterba and Lawrence Summers shows that the Ricardian equivalence hypothesis is refuted by their results. In the Ronald Reagan era, the US government had a historically large budget deficit due to the Reagan administration tax cuts and increases in military spending. During 1976–80, government revenue was 10.01 percent of potential GNP, and it declined to 8.86 percent during 1981–1985. The ratio of the US government's budget deficit to its potential GNP did not exceed 4 percent from World War II until 1981, and exceeded 4 percent after 1981. The ratio of an inflation- and cycle-adjusted deficit to the potential GNP was 2.56 percent during 1981–1986, and this ratio was the largest between 1958 and 1986. If the Ricardian equivalence hypothesis is true, the rational consumers of the economy, who expect the government to raise taxes, try to reduce their consumption and increase their saving. The reality was that the net private saving as a percentage of GNP was 8.55 in the 1976–1980 period, and it decreased to 7.47 percent in the 1981–1986 period. The ratio of consumption to GNP was 62.96 percent in the 1976–1980 period, and slightly increased to 64.72 percent in the 1981–1986 period.

Table 1 Saving and Consumption Measures 1961–86
Year	government saving (% of potential GNP)	inflation-adjusted government saving (% of potential GNP)	consumption (% of GNP)	private saving (% of potential GNP)	inflation-adjusted private saving (% of potential GNP)	net private saving (% of GNP)
1961–65	-0.3	0.4	63.05	8.2	7.5	8.25
1966–70	-0.5	0.9	62.09	8.5	6.9	8.23
1971–75	-1.1	1.0	62.47	8.4	6.4	9.10
1976–80	-0.8	1.5	62.96	7.3	5.1	8.55
1981–86	-2.8	-1.4	64.72	5.6	4.5	7.47

The facts about private saving, government saving and consumption in the US are shown in Table 1. Their finding is that increases in government deficits are followed by decreases in private saving. They see the increase in the consumption-to-GNP ratio during 1981–86, when the governmental dissaving is accelerated by Reaganomics. Their results refute the Ricardian equivalence hypothesis.

A study by Galí, López-Salido, and Valles (2005) provides further compelling evidence that government spending shocks tend to increase private consumption—contrary to Ricardian equivalence. The authors extend a standard New Keynesian model by introducing "rule-of-thumb" consumers, who spend all their current income, alongside Ricardian consumers, and allow for sticky prices. Their empirical analysis of U.S. data confirms that consumption rises persistently following government spending shocks. The model demonstrates that, under plausible parameters, such behavior results in stronger multipliers and matches observed spending patterns more closely than the traditional Ricardian framework.

== An argument for countercyclical fiscal policies ==
Ricardian equivalence has crucial importance in the fiscal policy considerations of new classical macroeconomics. When assessing Ricardian equivalence or any of the new classical doctrines, one should bear in mind the conditional character of these theses. Thus the equivalence theorem should not be separated from the assumptions on which it is based. In other words, Ricardian equivalence does not mean that any countercyclical efforts will fail, but outlines the necessary conditions for that failure and, naturally, for success at the same time. Governments do not have any potential to exert countercyclical efforts if the path of government expenditures is fixed and if agents form rational expectations. If these conditions hold, cuts in taxes imply a later pressure to raise taxes, since government has to fill the resource gap in the budget which is the result of the initial tax cut. So, rational agents will put the additional income from the tax cut into saving, and consumption does not rise. In this story, if these processes can be changed by the government, or, in any way, the additional income can be believed not to be withdrawn later, the initial tax cut will induce a rise in public consumption expenditures.

So countercyclical fiscal policy can be effective if any one of the conditions necessary for the equivalence does not hold. Controlling the real economy is possible perhaps even in a Keynesian style if government regains its potential to exert this control. Therefore, actually, new classical macroeconomics highlights the conditions under which fiscal policy can be effective and not the inefficiency of fiscal policy. Countercyclical aspirations need not to be abandoned, only the playing-field of economic policy got narrowed by new classical macroeconomics. Keynes urged active countercyclical efforts of fiscal policy and these efforts are not predestined to fail not even in the new classical theory, only the conditions necessary for the efficiency of countercyclical efforts were specified by new classical macroeconomics. Ricardian equivalence underlines the importance of fiscal reforms, since such reforms are needed in order to change the path of government expenditures. When implementing comprehensive fiscal reforms which make public sector more efficient governments do not exert countercyclical efforts of course, but form the necessary conditions for regaining countercyclical potential. In this respect, Ricardian equivalence clarifies the exact conditions necessary for countercyclical fiscal policies.

== See also ==
- Public finance
- Government debt
- Policy-ineffectiveness proposition
- Say's law
- Fiscal policy
