= Random walk model of consumption =

Mathematical model in economics

The random walk model of consumption was introduced by economist Robert Hall. This model uses the Euler numerical method to model consumption. He created his consumption theory in response to the Lucas critique. Using Euler equations to model the random walk of consumption has become the dominant approach to modeling consumption.

== Background ==
Hall introduced his famous random walk model of consumption in 1978. His approach is differentiated from earlier theories by the introduction of the Lucas critique to modeling consumption. He incorporated the idea of rational expectations into his consumption models and sets up the model so that consumers will maximize their utility.

== Theory ==
Robert Hall was the first to derive the effects of rational expectations for consumption. His theory states that if Milton Friedman's permanent income hypothesis is correct, which in short says current income should be viewed as the sum of permanent income and transitory income and that consumption depends primarily on permanent income, and if consumers have rational expectations, then any changes in consumption should be unpredictable, i.e. follow a random walk. Hall's thoughts were: According to the permanent-income hypothesis, consumers deal with shifting income and try to smooth their consumption over time. At any given moment, a consumer selects their consumption based on their current expectations of their lifetime income. Throughout their life, consumers modify their consumption because they receive new information that makes them adjust their expectations. For example, a consumer receives an unexpected promotion at work and increases consumption. Whereas a consumer that is unexpectedly fired or demoted will decrease consumption. So changes in consumption reflect "surprises" about lifetime income. If consumers are optimally using all available information, then they should be surprised only by events that were completely unpredictable. Therefore, consumer's changes in consumption should be unpredictable as well.

== Model ==
Consider a two-period case. The Euler equation for this model is

$$E_{1}u'(c_{2})=\left(\frac{1 + \delta}{1 + r}\right) u'(c_{1})$$	1

where $\delta$ is the subjective time preference rate, $r$ is the constant interest rate, and $E_{1}$ is the conditional expectation at time period 1.

Assuming that the utility function is quadratic and $\delta=r$, equation (1) will yield

$$E_{1} c_{2} = c_{1}$$	2

Applying the definition of expectations to equation (2) will give:

$$c_{2} = c_{1}+\epsilon_{2}$$	3

where $\epsilon_{2}$ is the innovation term. Equation (3) suggests that consumption is a random walk because consumption is a function of only consumption from the previous period plus the innovation term.

== Implications ==
Robert Hall's rational expectation approach to consumption creates implications for forecasting and analyzing economic policies. "If consumers obey the permanent-income hypothesis and have rational expectations, then only unexpected policy changes influence consumption. These policy changes take effect when they change expectations." Though the policy changes affect consumption only as much as they affect forecast permanent income. Furthermore, only new information about policies can affect permanent income. This model implies that changes in consumption are unpredictable because consumers change their consumption only when they receive news about their lifetime resources.

== Advantages ==
Use of the Euler equations to estimate consumption appears to have advantages over traditional models. First, using Euler equations is simpler than conventional methods. This avoids the need to solve the consumer's optimization problem and is the most appealing element of using Euler equations to some economists.

== Criticisms ==
Controversy has arisen over using Euler equations to model consumption. When applying the Euler consumption equations one has trouble explaining empirical data. Attempting to use the Euler equations to model consumption in the United States has led some economists to reject the random walk hypothesis. Some argue that this is due to the model's inability to uncover consumer preference variables such as the intertemporal elasticity of substitution.

== See also ==
- New Keynesian economics § The science of monetary policy
- Consumption smoothing
- Stochastic discount factor § Consumption-Based Model
- Financial economics § Stochastic discount factor
