= Consumption smoothing =

Mathematical model as an economic concept

Consumption smoothing is an economic concept for the practice of optimizing a person's standard of living through an appropriate balance between savings and consumption over time. An optimal consumption rate should be relatively similar at each stage of a person's life rather than fluctuate wildly. Luxurious consumption at an old age does not compensate for an impoverished existence at other stages in one's life.

Since income tends to be hump-shaped across an individual's life, economic theory suggests that individuals should on average have low or negative savings rate at early stages in their life, high in middle age, and negative during retirement. Although many popular books on personal finance advocate that individuals should at all stages of their careers set aside money in savings, economist James Choi states that this deviates from the advice of economists.

== Expected utility model ==
The graph below illustrates the expected utility model, in which U(c) is increasing in and concave in c. This shows that there are diminishing marginal returns associated with consumption, as each additional unit of consumption adds less utility. The expected utility model states that individuals want to maximize their expected utility, as defined as the weighted sum of utilities across states of the world. The weights in this model are the probabilities of each state of the world happening. According to the "more is better" principle, the first order condition will be positive; however, the second order condition will be negative, due to the principle of diminishing marginal utility. Due to the concave actual utility, marginal utility decreases as consumption increase; as a result, it is favorable to reduce consumption in states of high income to increase consumption in low income states.

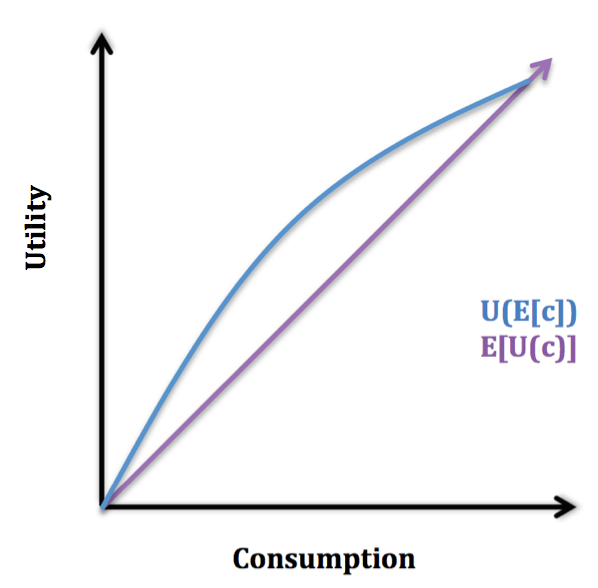
The graph shows expected utility, E[U(c)], after consumption smoothing (e.g. insurance), and actual utility, U(E[c]), without consumption smoothing.

Expected utility can be modeled as:

$EU = q*U(W| bad state) + (1-q)*U(W|goodstate)$

where:

$q$ = probability you will lose all your wealth/consumption

$W$ = wealth

The model shows expected utility as the sum of the probability of being in a bad state multiplied by utility of being in a bad state and the probability of being in a good state multiplied by utility of being in a good state.

Similarly, actuarially fair insurance can also be modeled:

$EU = (1-q)*U(W-p) + q*U(W-p-d+p/q)$

where:

$q$ = probability you will lose all your wealth/consumption

$W$ = wealth

$d$ = damages

An actuarially fair premium to pay for insurance would be the insurance premium that is set equal to the insurer's expected payout, so that the insurer will expect to earn zero profit. Some individuals are risk-averse, as shown by the graph above. The blue line, $U(c)=\sqrt{c}$ is curved upwards, revealing that this particular individual is risk-averse. If the blue line was curved downwards, this would reveal the preference for a risk-seeking individual. Additionally, a straight line would reveal a risk-neutral individual.

Risk aversion (red) contrasted to risk neutrality (yellow) and risk loving (orange) in different settings. Left graph: A risk averse utility function is concave (from below), while a risk loving utility function is convex. Middle graph: In standard deviation-expected value space, risk averse indifference curves are upward sloped. Right graph: With fixed probabilities of two alternative states 1 and 2, risk averse indifference curves over pairs of state-contingent outcomes are convex.

== Insurance and consumption smoothing ==
One method used to smooth consumption is insurance. Insurance allows people to translate consumption from periods where their consumption is high (having a low marginal utility) to periods when their consumption is low (having a high marginal utility). Due to many possible states of the world, people want to decrease the amount of uncertain outcomes of the future. Basic insurance theory states that individuals will demand full insurance to fully smooth consumption across difference states of the world. This explains why people purchase insurance, whether in healthcare, unemployment, and social security. To help illustrate this, think of a simplified hypothetical scenario with Person A, who can exist in one of two states of the world. Assume Person A who is healthy and can work; this will be State X of the world. One day, an unfortunate accident occurs, person A no longer can work. Therefore, he cannot obtain income from work and is in State Y of the world. In State X, Person A enjoys a good income from his work place and is able to spend money on necessities, such as paying rent and buying groceries, and luxuries, such as traveling to Europe. In State Y, Person A no longer obtains an income, due to injury, and struggles to pay for necessities. In a perfect world, Person A would have known to save for this future accident and would have more savings to compensate for the lack of income post-injury. Rather than spend money on the trip to Europe in State X, Person A could have saved that money to use for necessities in State Y. However, people tend to be poor predictors of the future, especially ones that are myopic. Therefore, insurance can "smooth" between these two states and provide more certainty for the future.

== Microcredit and consumption smoothing ==
Though there are arguments stating that microcredit does not effectively lift people from poverty, some note that offering a way to consumption smooth during tough periods has shown to be effective. This supports the principle of diminishing marginal utility, where those who have a history of suffering in extremely low income states of the world want to prepare for the next time they experience an adverse state of the world. This leads to the support of microfinance as a tool to consumption smooth, stating that those in poverty value microloans tremendously due to its extremely high marginal utility.

== Hall and Friedman's model ==
Another model to look at for consumption smoothing is Hall's model, which is inspired by Milton Friedman. Since Friedman's 1956 permanent income theory and Modigliani and Brumberg's 1954 life-cycle model, the idea that agents prefer a stable path of consumption has been widely accepted. This idea came to replace the perception that people had a marginal propensity to consume and therefore current consumption was tied to current income.

Friedman's theory argues that consumption is linked to the permanent income of agents. Thus, when income is affected by transitory shocks, for example, agents' consumption should not change, since they can use savings or borrowing to adjust. This theory assumes that agents are able to finance consumption with earnings that are not yet generated, and thus assumes perfect capital markets. Empirical evidence shows that liquidity constraint is one of the main reasons why it is difficult to observe consumption smoothing in the data. In 1978, Robert Hall formalized Friedman's idea. By taking into account the diminishing returns to consumption, and therefore, assuming a concave utility function, he showed that agents optimally would choose to keep a stable path of consumption.

With (cf. Hall's paper)

$E_t$ being the mathematical expectation conditional on all information available in $t$
$\delta = 1/\beta-1$ being the agent's rate of time preference
$r_t = R_t - 1\ge \delta$ being the real rate of interest in $t$
$u$ being the strictly concave one-period utility function
$c_t$ being the consumption in $t$
$y_t = w_t$ being the earnings in $t$
$A_t$ being the assets, apart from human capital, in $t$.

agents choose the consumption path that maximizes:

$$E_{0}\sum_{t=0}^{\infty }\beta^{t}\left[u(c_{t})\right]$$

Subject to a sequence of budget constraints:

$$A_{t+1}=R_{t+1}(A_{t}+y_{t}-c_{t})$$

The first order necessary condition in this case will be:

$$\beta E_{t}R_{t+1}\frac{u^{\prime }(c_{t+1})}{u^{\prime }(c_{t})}=1$$

By assuming that $R_{t+1}=R=\beta ^{-1}$ we obtain, for the previous equation:

$$E_{t}u^{\prime }(c_{t+1})=u^{\prime }(c_{t})$$

Which, due to the concavity of the utility function, implies:

$$E_{t}[c_{t+1}]=c_{t}$$

Thus, rational agents who assume constant asset returns would expect to achieve the same consumption in every period.

Hall also showed that for a quadratic utility function, the optimal consumption is equal to:

$$c_{t}=\left[ \frac{r}{1+r}\right] \left[ E_{t}\sum_{i=0}^{\infty
}\left( \frac{1}{1+r}\right) ^{i}y_{t+i}+A_{t}\right]$$

This expression shows that agents choose to consume a fraction of their present discounted value of their human and financial wealth.

== Empirical evidence for Hall and Friedman's model ==
Robert Hall (1978) estimated the Euler equation in order to find evidence of a random walk in consumption. The data used are US National Income and Product Accounts (NIPA) quarterly from 1948 to 1977. For the analysis the author does not consider the consumption of durable goods. Although Hall argues that he finds some evidence of consumption smoothing, he does so using a modified version. There are also some econometric concerns about his findings.

Wilcox (1989) argue that liquidity constraint is the reason why consumption smoothing does not show up in the data. Zeldes (1989) follows the same argument and finds that a poor household's consumption is correlated with contemporaneous income, while a rich household's consumption is not. A recent meta-analysis of 3000 estimates reported in 144 studies finds strong evidence for consumption smoothing.

== See also ==
- Consumer choice
- Risk compensation
