= Consumer spending =

Total spending by a set of households

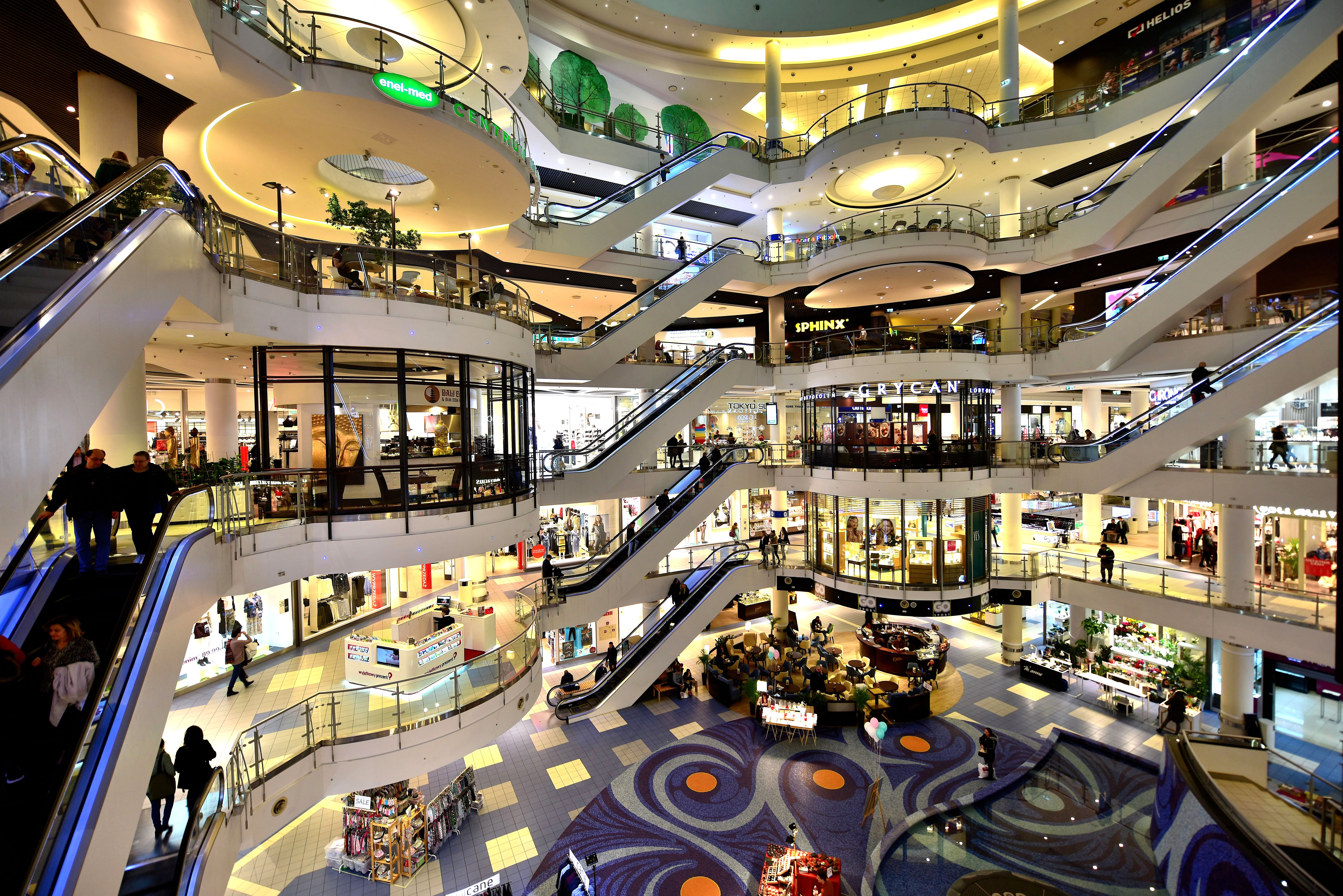
Consumers can buy a large range of goods and services at shopping malls.

Consumer spending is the total money spent on final goods and services by individuals and households.

There are two components of consumer spending: induced consumption (which is affected by the level of income) and autonomous consumption (which is not).

== Macroeconomic factors ==
=== Taxes ===
Taxes are a tool in the adjustment of the economy. Tax policies designed by governments affect consumer groups, net consumer spending and consumer confidence. Economists expect tax manipulation to increase or decrease consumer spending, though the precise impact of specific manipulations are often the subject of controversy.

Underlying tax manipulation as a stimulant or suppression of consumer spending is an equation for gross domestic product (GDP). The equation is GDP = C + I + G + NX, where C is private consumption, I is private investment, G is government and NX is the net of exports minus imports. Increases in government spending create demand and economic expansion. However, government spending increases translates to tax increases or deficit spending. This creates a potential negative impact on private consumption, investment, and/or the balance of trade.

=== Consumer sentiment ===
Consumer sentiment is the general attitude of consumers toward the economy and the health of the fiscal markets, and they are a strong constituent of consumer spending. Sentiments have a powerful ability to cause fluctuations in the economy, because if the attitude of the consumer regarding the state of the economy is bad, then they will be reluctant to spend. Therefore, sentiments prove to be a powerful predictor of the economy, because when people have faith in the economy or in what they believe will soon occur, they will spend and invest with confidence. However sentiments do not always affect the spending habits of some people as much as they do for others. For example, some households set their spending strictly off of their income, so that their income closely equals, or nearly equals their consumption (including savings). Others rely on their sentiments to dictate how they spend their income and such.

=== Government economic stimulus ===
In times of economic trouble or uncertainty, the government often tries to rectify the issue by distributing economic stimuli, often in the form of rebates or checks. However such techniques have failed in the past for several reasons. As was discussed earlier, temporary financial reprieve rarely succeeds because people do not often like rapidly shifting their spending habits. Also, people are many times intelligent enough to realize that economic stimulus packages are due to economic downturns, and therefore they are even more reluctant to spend them. Instead they put them into savings.

== Data ==
=== United States ===
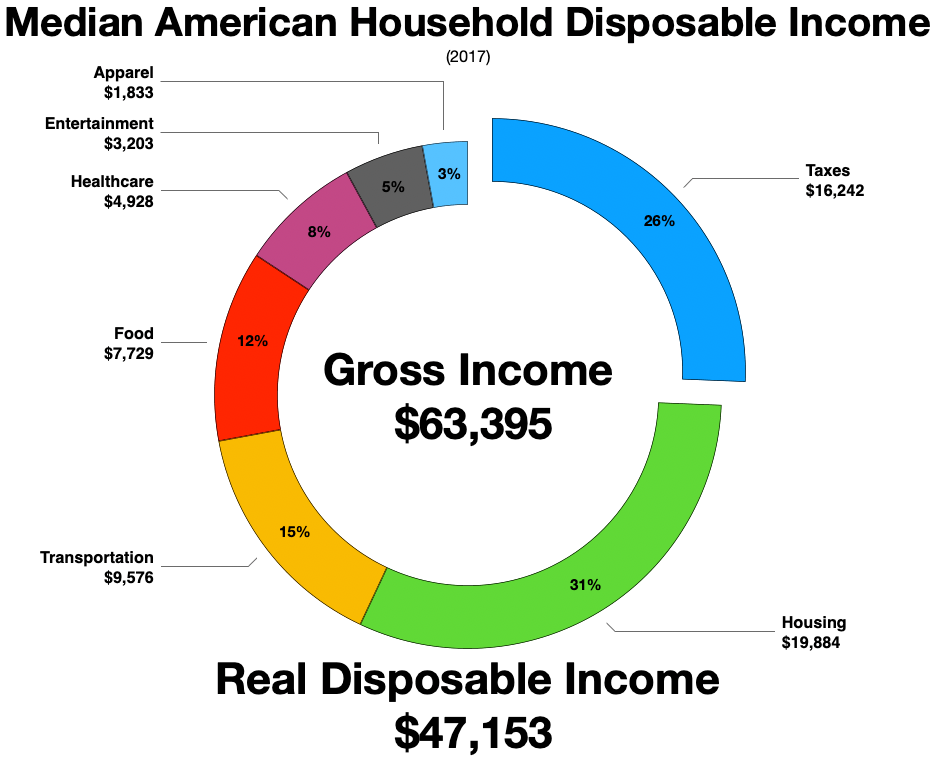
Household spending United States

In 1929, consumer spending was 75% of the nation's economy. This grew to 83% in 1932, when business spending dropped. Consumer spending dropped to about 50% during World War II due to large expenditures by the government and lack of consumer products. Consumer spending in the US rose from about 62% of GDP in 1960, where it stayed until about 1981, and has since risen to 71% in 2013.

In the United States, the Consumer Spending figure published by the Bureau of Economic Analysis includes three broad categories of personal spending.

- Durable goods: motor vehicles and parts, furnishings and durable household equipment, recreational goods and vehicles, and other durable goods.
- Nondurable goods: food and beverages purchased for off-premises consumption, clothing and footwear, gasoline and other energy goods, and other nondurable goods.
- Services: housing and utilities, healthcare, transportation services, recreation services, food services and accommodations, financial services and insurance, and other services.

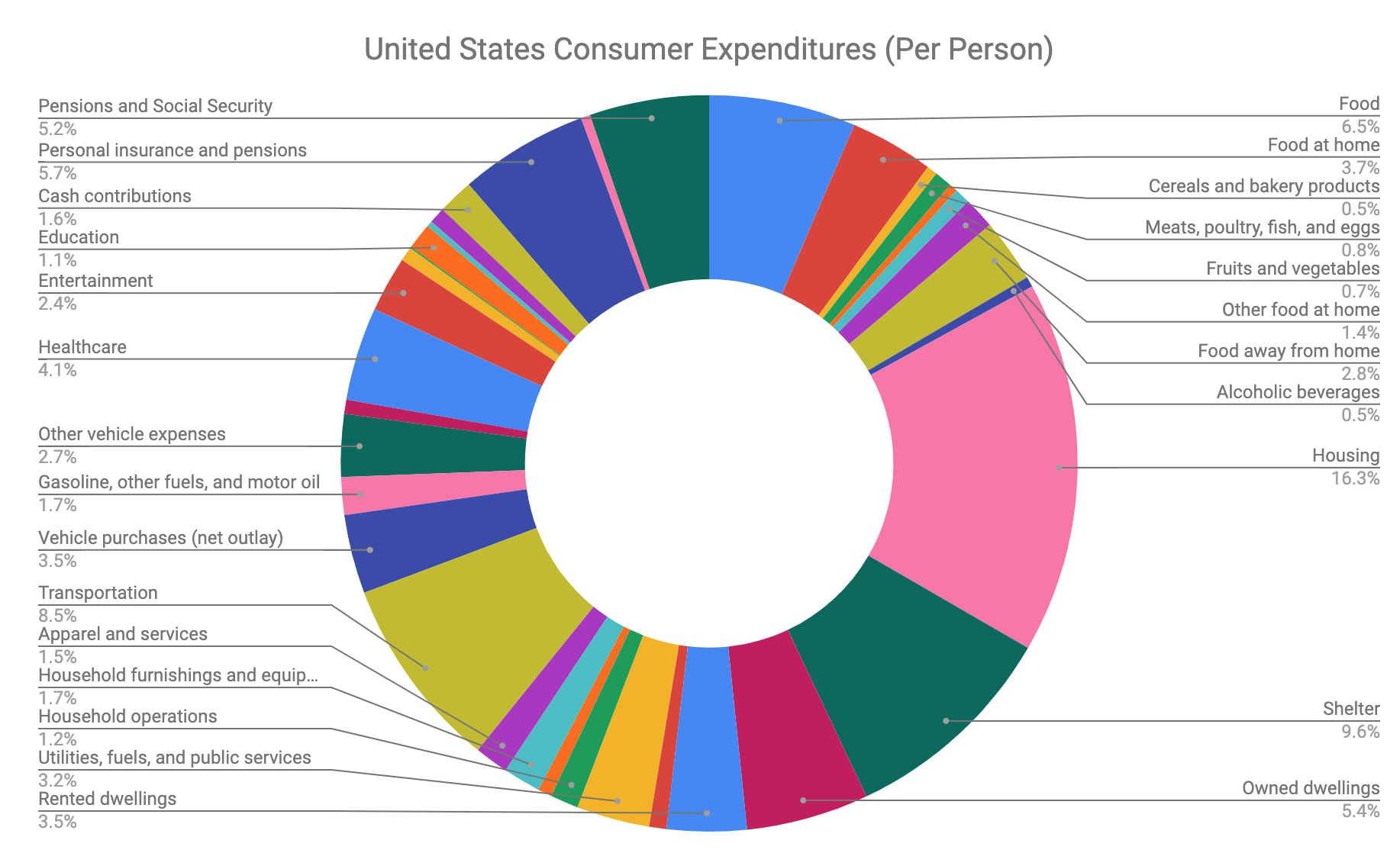
Consumer Expenditure per Person Surveys (CE) 2019 Annual Report Data

For U.S. domestic consumer spending by population and income demographics collected by the U.S Census Bureau at the household level and analyzed and published by the Bureau of Labor Statistics.

One indicator of high income inequality in the United States was that in 2024, the top 10% of earners (over $250,000) accounted for about half (49.7%) of US consumer spending.

== See also ==
- Consumer Expenditure Survey
- List of largest consumer markets
