= Asset price channel =

The asset price channel is the monetary transmission channel that is responsible for the distribution of the effects induced by monetary policy decisions made by the central bank of a country that affect the price of assets. These effects on the prices of assets will in turn affect the economy.

== Introduction ==
Policymakers should have a good understanding of how monetary policies transmit from a monetary tool into the goal. In order for monetary policies to have the desired effects on the economy policymakers should have an accurate assessment of the effects and timing of their policies. This is what the monetary transmission mechanism describes. There are several different channels through which a monetary policy can pass-through the economy.

The key monetarists' objection for analyzing monetary policy effects was that it traditionally focused on only one asset price, the interest rate, rather than on many asset prices. There are three other categories of asset prices besides those on debt instruments that are regarded as critical channels through which monetary policy affects the economy. These are (1) stock market prices, (2) exchange rates and (3) real estate prices. Changes in these asset prices affect investment and consumption decisions of both firms and households and therefore central banks often use it as an instrument of monetary policy.

== Stock price channel ==
Fluctuations in the stock market have important impacts on the economy, so also when influenced by Central Bank monetary policies. Transmission mechanisms involving the stock market have their results on the economy in three different ways. Firstly through their effects on investment in the stock market, for which stock prices are a determining factor. Secondly, changes in stock prices also have effects on a firm's balance sheet. Lastly, stock prices affect a households' wealth and liquidity by being directly related to the amount of financial wealth that a household holds.

=== Stock market effects on investment ===
A very well-known theory that describes how fluctuating stock prices affect the aggregate economy is Tobin's q theory. Tobin's q is defined as the total market value of firms divided by the replacement cost of capital. This means that if q > 1, the market price of the firm is higher than the replacement cost of capital and new plant equipment is cheap compared to the market value of firms. Under these circumstances, firms can issue stocks and get a high price for it, relatively to what it costs to buy the facilities and equipment that they need. As a result, investment spending will rise and firms buy this new equipment with only a small issue of stocks.

Expansionary monetary policy (a lower interest rate) make stocks relatively more attractive than bonds. More demand for stocks will generally tend to drive up their prices. In terms of Tobin's q it means that q goes up, since the nominator increases. As was explained above, this raises the level of investment spending of firms, thereby leading to an increase in aggregate demand and a rise in output. This process can be described by the following schematic: ↑ M → ↑ stock price → ↑ q → ↑ I → ↑ Y.

Alternatively, the effects of expansionary monetary policy can also be described as higher stock prices (again leading to more funds) lower the costs of capital (financing with stocks instead of bonds makes investment cheaper), and will rise both demand and aggregate output. In other words: ↑ M → ↑ stock price → ↓ c → ↑ I → ↑ Y. It can be argued by the same logic that the opposite holds for contractionary monetary policy.

=== Firm balance sheet effects ===
Following the same lines as described earlier, expansionary monetary policy causes stock prices to rise. When the stock price of a company increases, also the net worth of a company increases. This holds because the market capitalization of a company is equal to the total value of its outstanding stocks, which in turn provides a proxy for the company's net worth. Lending to companies with a lower net worth is more risky because these companies generally have less collateral and so the changes of potential losses are higher. This increases the risk of moral hazard and adverse selection problems for firms with a lower net worth. Therefore, a decline in net worth increases moral hazard and adverse selection problems and may lead to less lending to finance investment spending.

This mechanism is called the firm balance-sheet effects because it works through the effect on stock prices on the firm's balance sheet. Expansionary policy rises the stock prices of the firm, which increases the net worth of the company. This decreased problems of moral hazard and adverse selection which means that funds to finance investments can rise. This again leads to a higher output of the economy. ↑ M → ↑ stock price → ↑ NW → ↑ L → ↑ I → ↑ Y.

=== Household liquidity and wealth effects ===
Monetary policy can also operate through the link between money and stock prices. In general, durable products and housing are very illiquid assets because of asymmetric information (information on their quality can be very non-transparent). The higher the amount of financial assets, such as stocks, relative to a household's debt (in other words, the higher the amount of liquid assets), the lower the risk for financial distress. Consumers will then be less reluctant to purchase durable products and spend on residential and housing assets. This will again have a positive on aggregate demand and the output of the economy. ↑ M → ↑ stock price → ↑ financial assets → ↓ financial distress → ↑ C_{durables}, ↑ H → ↑ Y, where C_{durables} is the consumption of durable goods and H is the spending on housing and residential assets.

Similarly, it can be argued that when expansionary policy rises the stock prices, it automatically also rises the value of the financial wealth of a household and consumption will increase. This effect of stock prices is explained by Modigliani's model of life-cycle consumption theory. This theory states that an important component of consumer's lifetime resources are stocks and that stocks therefore are an important determinant for consumption. ↑ M → ↑ stock price → ↑ W → ↑ C → ↑ Y, where W is the financial wealth of a household.

== Exchange rate channel ==
There are two main channels through which monetary policies that affect the exchange rate operate in the economy: first, and most important, through their effects on exports, and secondly through their effects on companies' balance sheets.

=== Exchange rate effects on exports ===
Mainly in export-oriented economies, the effects of monetary policy transmission operating through exchange rate effects has been a major concern of their central banks. Expansionary monetary policy will cause the interest rate in a country to fall and deposits that are denominated in that domestic currency become less attractive than their foreign equivalents. As a result, the value of domestic deposits will fall compared to foreign deposits, which leads to a depreciation of the domestic currency. Since the value of the domestic currency is falling compared to foreign currencies, it now takes more of the domestic currency to buy a same amount in the foreign currency, and thus a depreciation of a currency is denoted be ↑e. As a result of this depreciation (domestic products become cheaper), net exports will rise and consequently so will aggregate spending. ↑ M → ↑ e → ↑ NX → ↑ Y.

=== Exchange rate effects on balance sheets ===
When countries have debt denominated in foreign currencies, the burden of their financial debt will rise when an expansionary monetary policy is implemented. The same reason in as in the previous section applies. The domestic currency will depreciate against the foreign currency and this will increase the amount of foreign currency needed to pay the debt and the debt burden increases. However, assets that are debt-financed are generally denoted in the domestic currency, and thus their value does not increase with expansionary policy, but rather decreases the net worth (compared to foreign currency). This again increases the problems of moral hazard and adverse selection and therefore will drive the amount of funds available through lending down. As a results, investment spending and accordingly aggregate spending will decrease. ↑ M → ↑ e → ↓ NW → ↓ I → ↓ Y Note that both effects of the exchange rate are opposite.

== Real estate price channel ==
Another important asset besides stocks that should therefore also be considered as an important transmission channel is real estate. Real estate prices can affect the output of an economy via three different routes: 1) effects on housing expenditures, 2) household's wealth and 3) bank balance sheets.

=== Direct effects on housing expenditure ===
A monetary expansion policy that goes with a decrease of the interest rate, lowers the costs of financing houses (debt financing becomes cheaper). With equal house prices, houses become relatively more expensive and the construction of new houses (H) becomes more attractive. As a result, housing expenditures (such as the construction of new houses) will increase and so aggregate demand will rise. ↑ M → ↑ P_{houses} → ↑ H → ↑ Y.

=== Household wealth effects ===
As we saw in Modigliani's lifecycle consumption theory before, houses are also a very important component of a households' financial wealth. The amount of financial wealth of a household directly affects the amount of spending. Therefore, an expansionary monetary policy that increases the housing prices also increases a household's financial wealth. This will have a positive effects on consumption and spending behavior. Therefore: ↑ M → ↑ P_{houses} → ↑ W → ↑ C → ↑ Y.

== The role of asset prices in monetary policy ==
=== Developed countries ===
Developed countries experience an increasing level of market integration and therefore the asset price channel becomes increasingly important in the transmission of monetary policy into the economy. The effects of monetary policies depend on other countries, and we have seen that a mechanism such as the exchange rate also depends on other assets. However, despite the significance of asset prices in the conduct of monetary policy, economic outcomes might be worse when central banks try to target asset prices because this erodes the support for their independence.

=== Emerging countries ===
Emerging countries and developing countries often have a larger part of their debt in foreign currencies and in that case expansionary monetary policy can actually have contractionary effects because the net worth of banks may fall. As a result, less funds will be available and investment will fall, and so will aggregate expenditure. Depreciation in emerging markets, when acting contractionary, are dangerous because they can trigger a financial crisis.
