= Consumption function =

Economic model relating consumption and disposable income

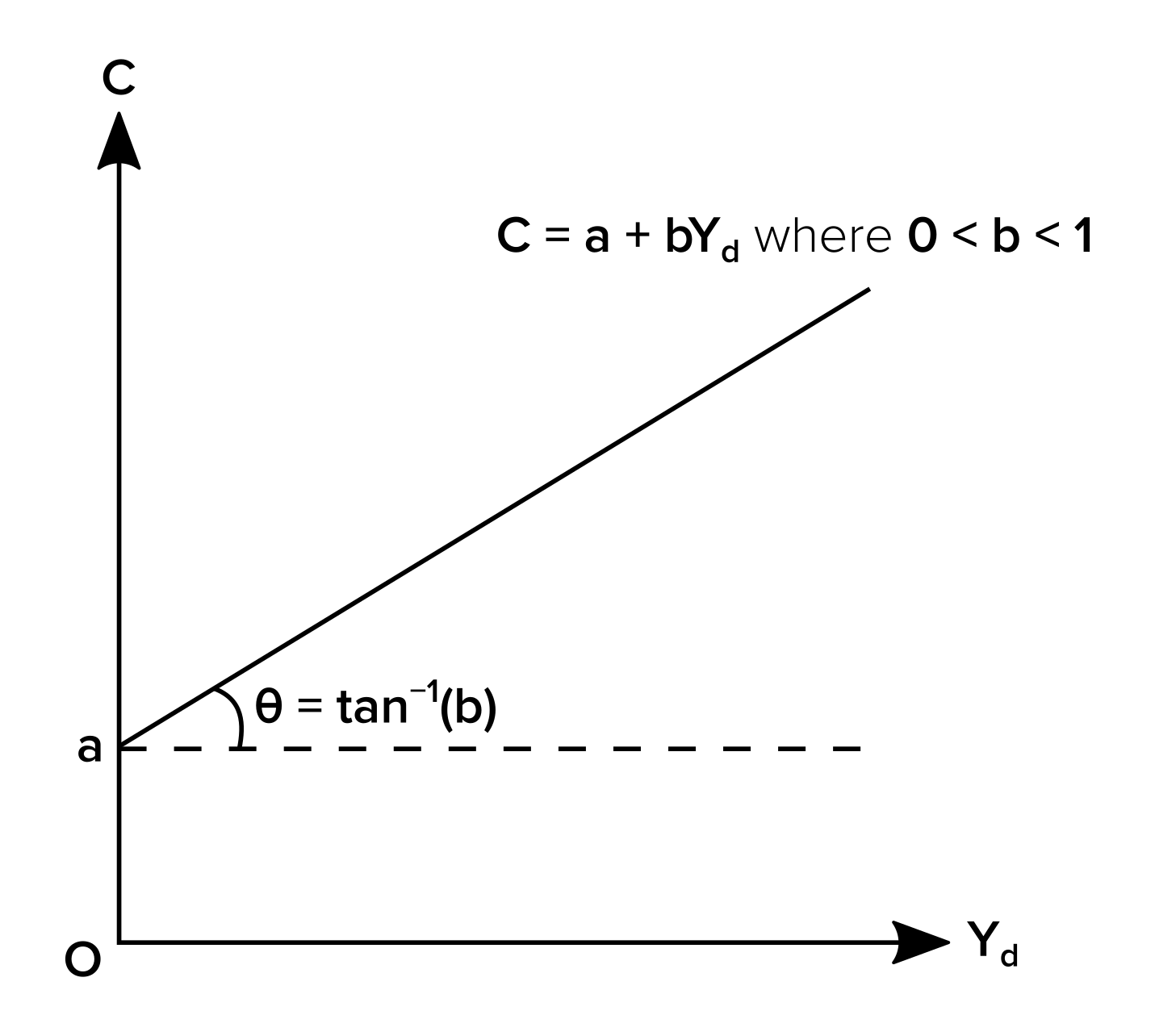
Graphical representation of the consumption function, where a is autonomous consumption (affected by interest rates, consumer expectations, etc.), b is the marginal propensity to consume and Yd is disposable income

In economics, the consumption function describes a relationship between consumption and disposable income. The concept is believed to have been introduced into macroeconomics by John Maynard Keynes in 1936, who used it to develop the notion of a government spending multiplier.

== Details ==
Its simplest form is the linear consumption function used frequently in simple Keynesian models:

$$C = a + b \cdot Y_{d}$$

where $a$ is the autonomous consumption that is independent of disposable income; in other words, consumption when disposable income is zero. The term $b \cdot Y_{d}$ is the induced consumption that is influenced by the economy's income level $Y_{d}$. The parameter $b$ is known as the marginal propensity to consume, i.e. the increase in consumption due to an incremental increase in disposable income, since $\partial C / \partial Y_{d} = b$. Geometrically, $b$ is the slope of the consumption function.

Keynes proposed this model to fit three stylized facts:

- People typically spend a part, but not all of their income on consumption, and they save the rest. They typically do not borrow money to spend, or borrow money to save. This fact is modelled by requiring $b \in (0,1)$.
- People with higher income save a higher proportion of the income. This is modelled by $\frac{C}{Y_d}$ decreasing with $Y_d$.
- People, when deciding how much to save, are insensitive to the interest rate.

By basing his model in how typical households decide how much to save and spend, Keynes was informally using a microfoundation approach to the macroeconomics of saving.

Keynes also took note of the tendency for the marginal propensity to consume to decrease as income increases, i.e. $\partial^{2} C / \partial Y_{d}^{2} < 0$. If this assumption is to be used, it would result in a nonlinear consumption function with a diminishing slope. Further theories on the shape of the consumption function include James Duesenberry's (1949) relative consumption expenditure, Franco Modigliani and Richard Brumberg's (1954) life-cycle hypothesis, and Milton Friedman's (1957) permanent income hypothesis.

Some new theoretical works following Duesenberry's and based in behavioral economics suggest that a number of behavioural principles can be taken as microeconomic foundations for a behaviorally-based aggregate consumption function.

== See also ==
- Aggregate demand
- Absolute income hypothesis
- Life cycle hypothesis
- Measures of national income and output
- Permanent income hypothesis
