= Dissaving =

Dissaving is negative saving. If spending is greater than disposable income, dissaving is taking place. This spending is financed by already accumulated savings, such as money in a savings account, or it can be borrowed. Household dissaving therefore corresponds to an absolute decrease in their financial investments.

Usually dissavings start after retirement, when an individual starts deducting money from the amount that he has been saving during his life time. There are also other reasons for dissavings; like big purchases, huge events, and emergencies. On the macro level, also governments could reach a certain situation where they start dissaving from their accumulated funds.

== Why people save ==
Savings is when an income contributor keeps a certain amount of the income on a side (saving account) and start having an accumulative amount of money based on their savings. People usually save money for certain reasons such as: 1- Emergencies are those unexpected emerging events that might happen in a persons life and that might need a certain amount of money in order for it to be satisfied/solved (such as a health emergency, unexpected damage in some equipment, etc…). In such cases, having financial security can help reduces the chances of borrowing money or taking loans. 2- Kids education is one of the most crucial choices on an households future, therefore parents usually worry about their kids educations and are always willing save money for the increasing educational fees, or potential improvement in the degree obtained. 3- Big purchases like cars, house, or equipments wouldn’t be easily to be bought without any saved amount as sometimes they might constitute of more than 1.5 times of the monthly salary. Buying big purchases fills the satisfaction of the buyer depending on his/her preferences and willingness, leading to an improved well-being situation. 4- Accumulating wealth or increasing the cash reserves also help invest some money at the bank where the investor would be getting a certain interest rate on his/her saving account. Once an individual starts deducting a certain amount of money for any of these purposes, in addition to daily expenses, here starts the dissaving process.

== Why people dissave ==
There are multiple reasons why people dissave. The first one is that a person accumulates savings for the purpose of spending them after retirement. This type of dissaving is intentional and voluntary and requires planning how much to save and dissave in order not to run out of money in their savings. Another reason is that a person experiences a shock, e.g. sudden unemployment or medical emergency and is forced to spend more than they earn. This person first dissaves from their personal savings and possibly later has to borrow money to finance their expenses. Third reason is that a person lacks judgment and lives above their means. These people finance their spendings from credit and are the most prone to shocks which may lead to personal bankruptcy. We can also assimilate a request for credit to early dissaving. Indeed, a household that has a consumer credit for the acquisition of a good commits to repay the loan and the interest on its future income, which reduces its future savings.

Dissaving was reported as a typical response to deficits, for households with normal income and expenditure patterns during the depression of the 1930s. Although this phenomenon is very rare at the collective level, it is quite common at the individual level since, the purpose of savings is to one day be used for consumer purchases. With a phenomenon of dissaving at the collective level would be bad for the economy of a country since it is used for financing. Zero savings would practically prevent the financing of new investments and therefore potential growth. Dissaving at the collective level would have even more important consequences because the decrease in outstanding investments would lead to a drop in the value of financial securities (stocks and bonds) and would risk putting out of business the banks and the systems of collecting savings. Massive dissaving to consumption can also lead to inflation risks if the production of consumer goods is not sufficient to meet new demand.

== Saving and dissaving lifecycle ==
=== The life-cycle approach of the saving and dissaving decisions ===
Lowest tier people with the lowest income tend to save little while they are working, which leads to little dissaving as a consequence after their retirement. Even if they were disciplined to save some amount of money during their working/production life, their meager savings would be quickly consumed after a short period of dissaving. (Low saving, low dissaving) Highest tier people with the highest income are generally observed to have a high rate of savings; as a result of their more prosperous circumstances, they tend to dissave less. Still, periods of dissaving occur when they face a health problem, or when unemployed with a higher household expense rate. (High saving, low dissaving) Middle tier people who have a moderate income experience cycles of savings and dissaving during their lifetime. If responsible, middle-income people often save as much as they can during their working life; then when they face a health shock or begin collecting a small pension in their old age, they will have the wherewithal to activate a moderate dissaving to ameliorate a financial shortcoming. (moderate saving, moderate dissaving)

== Inflation and dissavings ==
Another reason for dissaving occurs that when individuals experience a high rate of inflation or expect an increase in the inflation rate. If rational, these individuals might spend more of their current savings to convert it into concrete goods, as they expect the value of their fiat savings to deteriorate with high inflation. By contrast, these same individuals might maintain these savings if invested in active investment which can grow with the economy experiencing inflating prices.

== Dissaving at the retirement age ==
When young and starting to work for the first time (age 20), workers often battle heavy startup costs of life such as college loan repayment and high costs of raising children; so saving is often curtailed for many years with many bouts of dissaving. If responsible, eventually a working household can normalize their expenses and grow their earning rate with more valuable work skill to enable a healthy saving rate. Their income curve may exceed their consumption line, which enables a healthy saving rate. Upon retirement age (commonly presumed to occur around 65 in the USA), their actively earned income halts, perhaps partially perpetuated by passively-earned income from investments. As their investments are drained and the consumption rate maintains or grows with greater health care costs, dissaving begins to take place. This simplistic explanation of the saving/dissaving shift does not address the harsher circumstances experienced in many real individual circumstances. In many cases, when savings are limited, and when dissaving is chronically exhausted from a long-term challenge, an individual's solvency in society can rapidly destroy the quality and standard of life as their situation spirals down into desperate circumstances and deprivation. See: poverty.

== Governments dissavings ==
Dissavings can also occur on the macroeconomic level, that’s when the government tend to spend all the accumulated savings and the available funds, specially when a natural disaster happens such as an earthquake, wildfire, or hurricane. Other causes might be due to civil disorders, hyperinflation, or war.

== A real example of dissaving ==
In December 201? until January 201?, when the US faced a governmental shutdown, most of the governmental employees were forced to take an unpaid leave from their work. The consequence of this forced unpaid leave is that these employees started to dissave just to keep up with their daily living expenses and basic obligations, even if it wasn’t their fault. Intro

The life-cycle hypothesis of saving, of Ando and Modigliani, proposes that people work and save when they are young and retire and dissave when they become elderly. However, this theory is not fully verified, at least in France. The savings rate is falling due to the aging of the population. In fact, the savings rate continues to increase beyond the age of 50, reaching 22.5% for those over 60. This phenomenon is undoubtedly explained in part by the concern to pass on wealth to subsequent generations as well as to cover unforeseen health expenses.

== Relevant studies ==
Hayashi, Ando, and Ferris investigated whether the elderly save or dissave and found for the United States that families after retirement dissave on average about a third of their peak wealth by the time of death, leaving the rest (mostly their homes) as bequests. In contrast they found that for Japan the elderly forming independent households and those living with children continue to save, for all but the most elderly. From age 80 or more and, also the single elderly of all ages, the dissaving patterns were evident.

Later evidence presented by Horioka reinforces the life cycle hypothesis in Japan.

Clara Fernström researched whether there is any correlation between the dissaving of a person and the person’s age, gender, marital status, income and the probability of surviving until the following year. Her study shows following results and provides possible explanation as follows:

- Annual savings increase with lower survival probability. That might be explained by either bequest motives or the low utility rate of consumption for a person with low survival probability. Person with low survival probability is likely to be ill and not able to enjoy the consumption as much as a healthy person, therefore they decide to consume little.
- People with low income show less dissaving after a shock than people with high income. People with low income usually have low savings, therefore don’t have the possibility to dissave without borrowing. However, people with high savings can choose how much to dissave.
- People with children save more than childless people, which is explained by wanting to leave a bequest for their offspring.
- Married individuals save less than the singles. Unlike people with children, there seems to be no visible intent to save for bequest reasons. Moreover, it is possible that the utility rate of consumption is higher for married individuals, as the utility is shared with their spouse. Moreover, single people save more, because they can’t rely financially on their husband or wife.
- Older people dissave less than younger people, which is probably linked to the fact that older people have generally lower probability of survival.

== See also ==
- Autonomous consumption
- Debt
- Retirement spend down
