= Permanent income hypothesis =

Economic model explaining consumption pattern formation

The permanent income hypothesis (PIH) is a model in the field of economics to explain the formation of consumption patterns. It suggests consumption patterns are formed from future expectations and consumption smoothing. (Note: The term "consumption smoothing" refers to the tendency of consumers to "smooth out" consumption over their lifetimes; effectively, consumers spread out consumption over time because they want to guarantee stability and prevent diminishing marginal utility from decreasing their utility) The theory was developed by Milton Friedman and published in his A Theory of the Consumption Function, published in 1957 and subsequently formalized by Robert Hall in a rational expectations model. Originally applied to consumption and income, the process of future expectations is thought to influence other phenomena. In its simplest form, the hypothesis states changes in permanent income (human capital, property, assets), rather than changes in temporary income (unexpected income), are what drive changes in consumption.

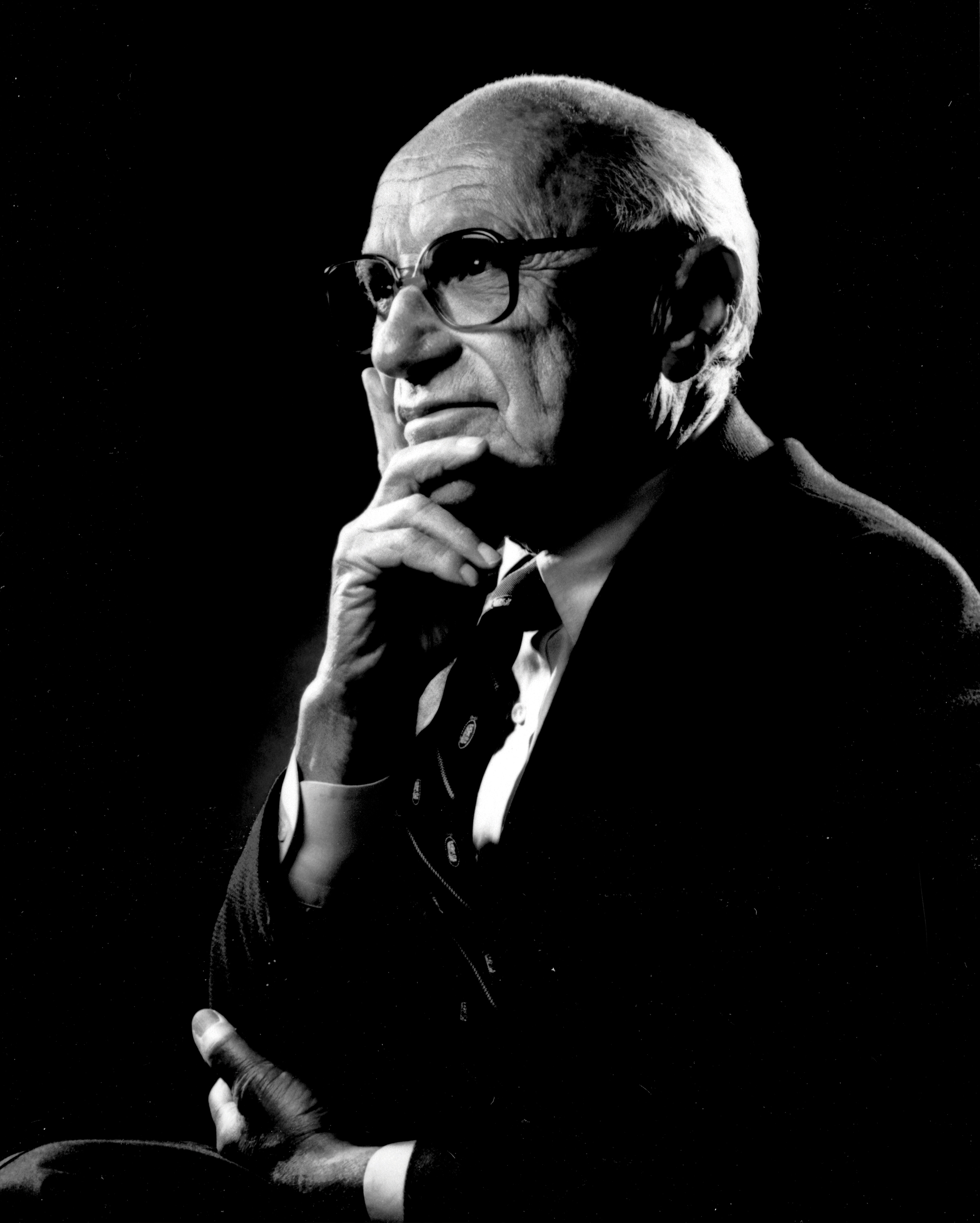
Milton Friedman, who first proposed the permanent income hypothesis.

The formation of consumption patterns opposite to predictions was an outstanding problem faced by the Keynesian orthodoxy. Friedman's predictions of consumption smoothing, where people spread out transitory changes in income over time, departed from the traditional Keynesian emphasis on a higher marginal propensity to consume (Note: The marginal propensity to consume (MPC) represents how much of a dollar a consumer spends or consumes, whereas the marginal propensity to save (MPS) represents how much of a dollar a consumer saves; these units are tracking marginal decision making) out of current income.

Income consists of a permanent (anticipated and planned) component and a transitory (unexpected and surprising) component. In the permanent income hypothesis model, the key determinant of consumption is an individual's lifetime income, not their current income. Unlike permanent income, transitory incomes are volatile.

== Background and history ==
Until A Theory of Consumption Function, the Keynesian absolute income hypothesis and interpretation of the consumption function were the most advanced and sophisticated. In its post-war synthesis, the Keynesian perspective was responsible for pioneering many innovations in recession management, economic history, and macroeconomics. Like the neoclassical school that preceded it, early inconsistencies had their roots in socio-political events contrary to the predictions put forward.

The introduction of the absolute income hypothesis is often attributed to John Maynard Keynes, a British economist, who wrote several books which are now the basis for Keynesian economics. The hypothesis put forward by Keynes was accepted and placed into the post–war synthesis. However, inconsistencies were not resolved swiftly, and economists were unable to explain the consistency of the savings rate in the face of rising real incomes (Fig. 1).

Relationship between Saving and Consumption Based on Budget Data

United States (USD)
| Date | Consumer Units | Avg. Income | APC (Note: The marginal propensity to consume (MPC) represents how much of a dollar a consumer spends or consumes, whereas the marginal propensity to save (MPS) represents how much of a dollar a consumer saves; these units are tracking marginal decision making) | MPC (Note: The marginal propensity to consume (MPC) represents how much of a dollar a consumer spends or consumes, whereas the marginal propensity to save (MPS) represents how much of a dollar a consumer saves; these units are tracking marginal decision making) |
|---|---|---|---|---|
| 1881–90 | Selected wage-earner families | $682 | .90 | .67 |
| 1901 | Selected wage-earner normal families | $651 | .92 | .68 |
| 1917–19 | Selected wage-earner families | $1,513 | .91 | .78 |
| 1935–36 | Nonrelief nonfarm families | $1,952 | .89 | .73 |
| 1935–36 | Nonrelief farm families | $1,259 | .87 | .57 |
| 1941 | Urban families | $2,865 | .92 | .79 |
| 1941 | Farm families | $1,680 | .83 | .57 |
| 1944 | Urban families | $3,411 | .82 | .57 |
| 1947 | Urban families | $3,323 | .92 | .78 |
| 1950 | Nonfarm families | $4,084 | .91 | .73 |
| 1950 | Spending units of one or more persons | $3,220 | .92 | .75 |

Fig. 1: Analysis of consumption and income; taken from Friedman (1957)

Before the neoclassical synthesis was established, Keynes and his hypothesis challenged the orthodoxy of neoclassical economics. As a result of the Great Depression, Keynes rapidly became among the leaders of economic thought. His MPC and MPS spending multipliers developed into the absolute income hypothesis (1), and were influential to the government responses to the ensuing depression.

| $C=a+b\cdot Y_d$ | 1 |

== Origins ==
The American economist Milton Friedman developed the permanent income hypothesis in his 1957 book A Theory of the Consumption Function. In his book, Friedman posits a theory that explained how and why future expectations change consumption.

Friedman's 1957 book A Theory of the Consumption Function created the basis for consumption smoothing. He argued the consumption model, in which outcomes are stochastic, (Note: Stochastic refers to the property of being well described by a random probability distribution) where consumers face risks and uncertainty to their labor incomes, (Note: Unlike capital (k), labor inputs are not fixed in the short term) complicates interpretations of indifference curves, and causes consumers to spread out or 'smooth' their spending based on their permanent income, which represents their anticipated income over their lifetimes. Friedman explains this by how, for example, consumers would consistently save more when they expect their long-term income to increase. A further elaboration is provided below:

'Yet from another point of view, the assumption seems highly implausible. Will not a man who receives an unexpected windfall use at least some part of it in "riotous living," i.e. in consumption expenditures? Would he be likely to add the whole of it to his wealth? The answer to these questions depends greatly on how "consumption" is defined. The offhand affirmative answer reflects in large measure, I believe, an implicit definition of consumption in terms of purchases, including durable goods, rather than in terms of the value of services. If the latter definition is adopted, as seems highly desirable in applying the hypothesis to empirical data—though unfortunately I have been able to do so to only a limited extent—much that one classifies offhand as consumption is reclassified as savings. Is not the windfall likely to be used for the purchase of durable goods? Or, to put it differently, is not the timing of the replacement of durable goods and of additions to the stock of such goods likely to some extent to be adjusted so as to coincide with windfalls?'

— A Theory of Consumption Function

== Theoretical considerations ==
In his theory, John Maynard Keynes supported economic policy makers by his argument emphasizing their capability of macroeconomic fine tuning. For Keynes, consumption expenditures are linked to disposable income by a parameter called the marginal propensity to consume (the amount per dollar consumers are willing to spend; $1-MPS=MPC$). Since the marginal propensity to consume itself is a function of income, it is also true that additional increases in disposable income lead to diminishing increases in consumption expenditures. It must be stressed that the relation characterized by substantial stability links current consumption expenditures to current disposable income—and, on these grounds, a considerable leeway is provided for aggregate demand stimulation, since a change in income immediately results in a multiplied shift in aggregate demand (this is the essence of the Keynesian case of the multiplier effect). The same is true of tax cut policies. According to the basic theory of Keynes, governments are always capable of countercyclical fine tuning of macroeconomic systems through demand management, although Friedman disputes this, arguing in a 1961 journal article that Keynesian macroeconomic fine tuning will succumb to 'long and variable lags.'

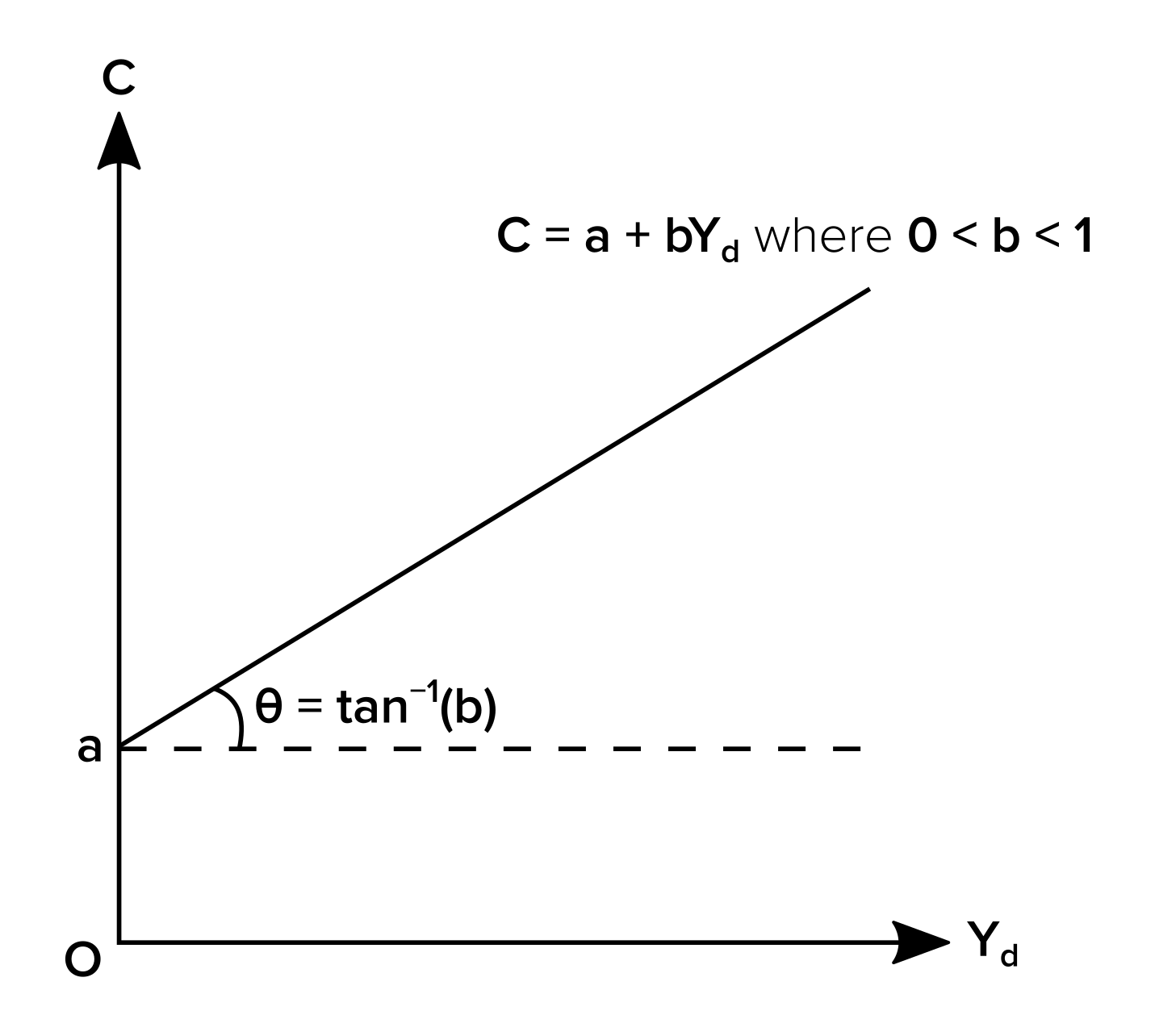
Model of the consumption function, where a is autonomous consumption, b is the MPC, and Yd is disposable income

The permanent income hypothesis questions this ability of governments. However, it is also true that permanent income theory is concentrated mainly on long run dynamics and relations, while Keynes focused primarily on short run considerations. Friedman's argument, which challenged the use of fiscal policy in smoothing out business cycles, was challenged by stressing the relation between consumption and disposable income still follows (more or less) the mechanism supposed by Keynes.

Friedman starts elaborating his theory under the assumption of complete certainty. Under such circumstances, for Friedman, two motives exist for a consumer unit to spend more or less on consumption than its income: The first is to smooth its consumption expenditures through appropriate timing of borrowing and lending; and the second is either to realize interest earnings on deposits if the relevant rate of interest is positive, or to benefit from borrowing if the interest rate is negative.

According to the PIH, the distribution of consumption across consecutive periods is the result of an optimizing method by which each consumer tries to maximize his utility. At the same time, whatever ratio of income one devotes to consumption in each period, all these consumption expenditures are allocated in the course of an optimization process—that is, consumer units try to optimize not only across periods but within each period.

== Calculation of income and consumption ==
Friedman's 1957 book also made an argument for an entirely new way of calculating income (income is represented by the variable $y$) by differentiating between transitory and permanent income (which was also taken to include ordinal elements like human capital and talents). In A Theory of Consumption Function, Friedman develops: $y=y_p+y_t$ as a formula. In an earlier study, Friedman, Kuznets (1945), he proposes the idea of transitory and permanent income.

Friedman also developed a consumption formula, $c=c_p +c_t$, with $c_p$ meaning the permanent component of consumption, with $c_t$ being the transitory component. Friedman also drew a distinction between $y_t$ and $c_t$. Transitory consumption can be interpreted as surprising or unexpected bills, such as a high water bill, or unexpected doctor's visit, which, in Friedman's mind, cannot be spurred by $y_t$, because unexpected or 'surprise' consumption is not often financed through windfall gains.

== Simple model ==
Consider a (potentially infinitely lived) consumer who maximizes his expected lifetime utility from the consumption of a stream of goods $c$ between periods $t$ and $T$, as determined by one period utility function $u(\cdot)$. In each period $t$, he receives an income $y_t$, which he can either spend on a consumption good $c_t$ or save in the form of an asset $A_t$ that pays a constant real interest rate $r$ in the next period.

The utility of consumption in future periods is discounted at the rate $\beta\in(0,1)$. Finally, let $\operatorname E_t[\cdot]$ denote the expected value conditional on the information available in period $t$. Formally, the consumer's problem is then

$$\max_{\{c_k\}_{k=t}^T} \operatorname E_t\sum_{k=0}^{T-t} \beta^k u(c_{t+k})$$

subject to

$$A_{t+1} = (1+r)(A_t + y_t - c_t).$$

Assuming the utility function is quadratic, and that $(1+r)\beta = 1$, the optimal consumption choice of the consumer is governed by the Euler equation

$$c_t = \operatorname E_t[c_{t+1}].$$

Given a finite time horizon of length $T-t$, we set $A_{T+1}=0$ with the understanding the consumer spends all his wealth by the end of the last period. Solving the consumer's budget constraint forward to the last period, we determine the consumption function is given by

| $c_t =\frac r{(1+r)-(1+r)^{-(T-t)}}\left[A_t + \sum_{k=0}^{T-t} \left(\frac 1 {1+r}\right)^k \operatorname E_t[y_{t+k}] \right].$ | 2 |

Over an infinite time horizon, we instead impose a no Ponzi game condition, which prevents the consumer from continuously borrowing and rolling over their debt to future periods, by requiring

$$\lim_{t\to\infty} \left(\frac 1 {1+r}\right)^t A_t=0.$$

The resulting consumption function is then

| $c_t =\frac r{1+r}\left[A_t + \sum_{k=0}^\infty \left(\frac 1 {1+r}\right)^k \operatorname{E}_t[y_{t+k}] \right].$ | 3 |

Both expressions (2) and (3) capture the essence of the permanent income hypothesis: current consumption is determined by a combination of current non human wealth $A_t$ and human capital wealth $y_t$. The fraction of total wealth consumed today further depends on the interest rate $r$ and the length of the time horizon over which the consumer is optimizing.

=== Liquidity constraints ===
Some have attempted to improve Friedman's original hypothesis by including liquidity constraints, most notably Christopher D. Carroll.

== Empirical evidence ==
Observations, recorded from 1888 to 1941, of stagnant average propensity to consume in the face of rising real incomes provide strong evidence for the existence of the permanent income hypothesis. An early test of the permanent income hypothesis was reported by Robert Hall in 1978, and, assuming rational expectations, finds consumption follows a martingale sequence. Hall & Mishkin (1982) analyze data from 2,000 households and find consumption responds much more strongly to permanent than to transitory movements of income, and reinforce the compatibility of the PIH with 80% of households in the sample. Bernanke (1984) finds 'no evidence against the permanent income hypothesis' when looking at data on automobile consumption.

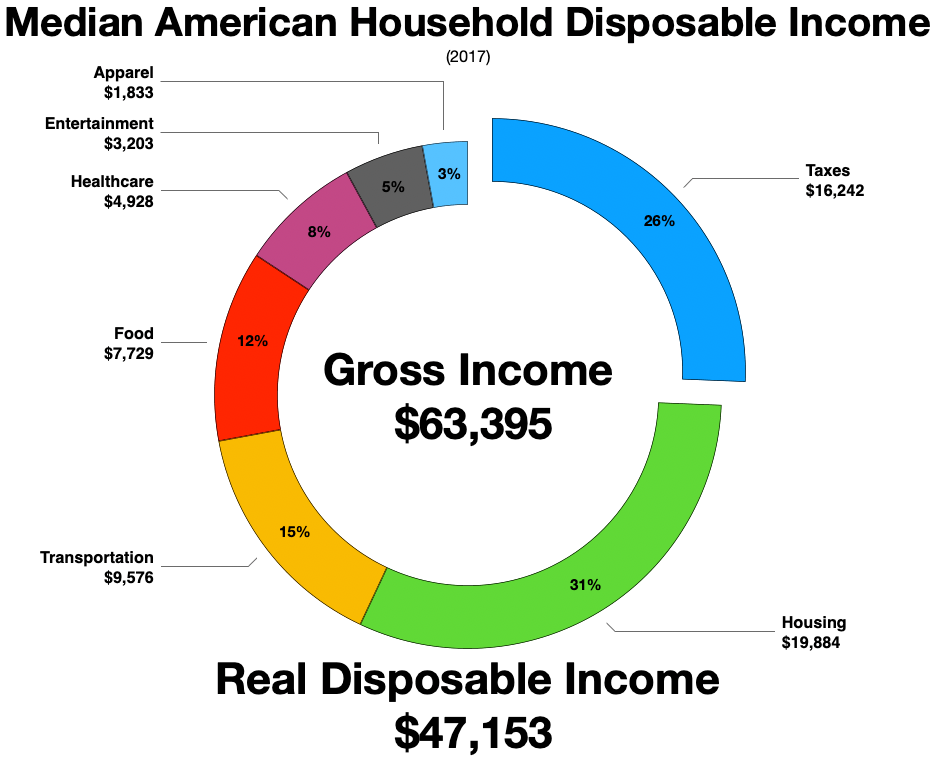
Median American household spending

In contrast, Flavin (1981) finds consumption is very sensitive to transitory income shocks ('excess sensitivity'), while Mankiw & Shapiro (1985) dispute these findings, arguing that Flavin's test specification (which assumes income is stationary) is biased towards finding excess sensitivity.

Souleles (1999) uses income tax refunds to test the PIH. Since a refund depends on income in the previous year, it is predictable income and should thus not alter consumption in the year of its receipt. The evidence finds that consumption is sensitive to the income refund, with a marginal propensity to consume between 35 and 60%. Stephens (2003) finds the consumption patterns of social security recipients in the United States is not well explained by the permanent income hypothesis.

Stafford (1974) argues that Friedman's explanation cannot account for market failures such as liquidity constraints. Carroll (1997) and Carroll (2001) dispute this, and adjust the model for limits on borrowing. A comprehensive analysis of 3000 tests of the hypothesis provides another explanation. It argues that rejections of the hypothesis are based on publication bias and that after correction, it is consistent with data.

== Policy implications ==
According to Costas Meghir, unresolved inconsistencies explain the failure of transitory Keynesian demand management techniques to achieve its policy targets. In a simple Keynesian framework the marginal propensity to consume (MPC) (Note: The marginal propensity to consume (MPC) represents how much of a dollar a consumer spends or consumes, whereas the marginal propensity to save (MPS) represents how much of a dollar a consumer saves; these units are tracking marginal decision making) is assumed constant, and so temporary tax cuts can have a large stimulating effect on demand. Shapiro & Slemrod (2003) find that consumers spread tax rebates over their temporal horizon.

== Reception ==
=== Criticism ===
Some critics of the permanent income hypothesis, such as Frank Stafford, have criticized the permanent income hypothesis for its lack of liquidity constraints. However, some studies have adapted the hypothesis for certain circumstances and found that the permanent income hypothesis is compatible with liquidity constraints and other market failures unaccounted for in the original hypothesis.

Alvarez-Cuadrado & Van Long (2011) argue that more affluent consumers save more of their permanent incomes, against what would be expected given the permanent income hypothesis.

=== Praise ===
Friedman received the 1976 Sveriges Riksbank prize in Economic Sciences in Memory of Alfred Nobel 'For his achievements in the field of consumption analysis, monetary history and theory and for his demonstration of the complexity of stabilization policy.' The 'consumption analysis' has been interpreted by Worek (2010) as representing Friedman's contributions in the form of the permanent income hypothesis, while the monetary history and stabilization section has been interpreted to refer to his work on monetary policy and history, and monetarism, which seeks to stabilize a currency, preventing erratic swings, respectively.

The Permanent Income Hypothesis has been met with praise from Austrian economists, such as Robert Mulligan.

== See also ==
- Consumption smoothing
- Income#Economic definitions
- Milton Friedman
- Ricardian equivalence
- Risk compensation
- Milton Friedman bibliography
