= Induced consumption =

Consumption that varies with income

Induced consumption is the portion of consumption that varies with disposable income. When a change in disposable income “induces” a change in consumption on goods and services, then that changed consumption is called “induced consumption”. In contrast, expenditures for autonomous consumption do not vary with income. For instance, expenditure on a consumable that is considered a normal good would be considered to be induced.

In the simple linear consumption function,

$C = a + b \times Y_{d}$

induced consumption is represented by the term $b \times Y_{d}$, where $Y_{d}$ denotes disposable income and $b$ is called the marginal propensity to consume.

== See also ==
- Lifestyle creep
- Diderot effect
- Induced demand
