= Absolute income hypothesis =

Economic hypothesis about consumption and savings

In economics, the absolute income hypothesis concerns how a consumer divides their disposable income between consumption and saving. It is part of the theory of consumption attributed to John Maynard Keynes. The American economist James Tobin (1918–2002) researched and developed this idea more extensively in the 1960s and 70s.

== Background ==
Keynes' General Theory in 1936 identified the relationship between income and consumption as a key macroeconomic relationship. Keynes asserted that real consumption (i.e. adjusted for inflation) is a function of real disposable income, which is total income net of taxes. As income rises, the theory asserts that consumption will also rise, but not necessarily at the same rate. When applied to a cross section of a population, rich people are expected to consume a lower proportion of their income than poor people.

Keynes framed this as three conjectures: that the marginal propensity to consume lies between zero and one, that the average propensity to consume falls as income rises because saving is a luxury, and that income is the main determinant of consumption, with the interest rate playing only a minor role. Household surveys and data from the interwar years seemed to support these claims. The second conjecture ran into trouble when Simon Kuznets's long-run data, starting in 1869, showed that the ratio of consumption to income stayed remarkably stable even as incomes grew considerably.

The marginal propensity to consume is present in Keynes' consumption theory and determines by what amount consumption will change in response to a change in income.

While this theory has success modeling consumption in the short term, attempts to apply this model over a longer time frame have proven less successful. This has led to the absolute income hypothesis falling out of favor as the consumption model of choice for economists. Keynes' consumption function has come to be known as 'absolute income hypothesis' or 'absolute income theory'. His statement of the relationship between income and consumption was based on psychological law.

== Model ==
The model is

$$C_{t} = \alpha + \lambda Y_{t}$$

where:

- $C_{t}$ is consumption at time t,
- $\alpha$ is autonomous consumption, a constant,
- $\lambda$ is the marginal propensity to consume ($0<\lambda<1$),
- $Y_{t}$ is disposable income at time t.

The component $\lambda Y_t$ represents induced consumption.

== See also ==
- Consumption function
