= Intertemporal consumption =

Economic study of how people consume and save throughout their lives

Economic theories of intertemporal consumption seek to explain people's preferences in relation to consumption and saving over the course of their lives. The earliest work on the subject was by Irving Fisher and Roy Harrod, who described 'hump saving', hypothesizing that savings would be highest in the middle years of a person's life as they saved for retirement.

In the 1950s, more well-defined models were built on discounted utility theory and approached the question of inter-temporal consumption as a lifetime income optimization problem. Solving this problem mathematically, assuming that individuals are rational and have access to complete markets, Modigliani & Brumberg (1954), Albert Ando, and Milton Friedman (1957) developed what became known as the life-cycle model. See Intertemporal choice § Modigliani's life cycle income hypothesis for details.

The life-cycle model of consumption suggests that consumption is based on average lifetime income instead of income at any given age. First, young people borrow to consume more than their income, next, as their income rises through the years, their consumption rises slowly and they begin to save more. Lastly, during their retirement these individuals live off of their savings. Furthermore this theory implies that consumption is smoothed out relative to a person's income which is the reason economists set consumption proportional to potential income rather than actual income.

Attempts to test the life-cycle model against real world data have met with mixed success. In a review of the literature, Courant, Gramlich and Laitner (1984) note "but for all its elegance and rationality, the life-cycle model has not tested out very well". The main discrepancies between predicted and actual behaviour is that people drastically 'underconsume' early and late in their lifetime by failing to borrow against future earnings and not saving enough to adequately finance retirement incomes respectively. People also seem to 'overconsume' during their highest earning years, the elderly do not consume from their assets as would be expected (particularly from their household equity) and also treat windfall gains in a manner inconsistent with the life-cycle model. Specific alterations to the theory have been proposed to help it accommodate the data; a bequest motive, capital market imperfections such as liquidity constraints, a changing individual utility function over time or a particular form of expectation as to future income.

Behavioural economists have proposed an alternate description of intertemporal consumption, the behavioural life cycle hypothesis. They propose that people mentally divide their assets into non-fungible mental accounts – current income, current assets (savings) and future income. The marginal propensity to consume (MPC) out of each of these accounts is different. Drawing upon empirical studies of consumption, superannuation and windfall gains they hypothesize that the MPC is close to one out of current income, close to zero for future income and somewhere in between with respect to current assets. These differing MPCs explain why people 'overconsume' during their highest earning years, why increasing superannuation contributions does not cause current savings to be reduced (as the life-cycle model implies) and why small windfall gains (which are coded as current income) are consumed at a high rate but a higher proportion of larger gains is saved.

== See also ==
- Albert Ando
- Dissaving
- Intertemporal choice
- Permanent income hypothesis
- Temporal discounting
- Wealth elasticity of demand
