= Consumption (economics) =

Using money to obtain an item for use

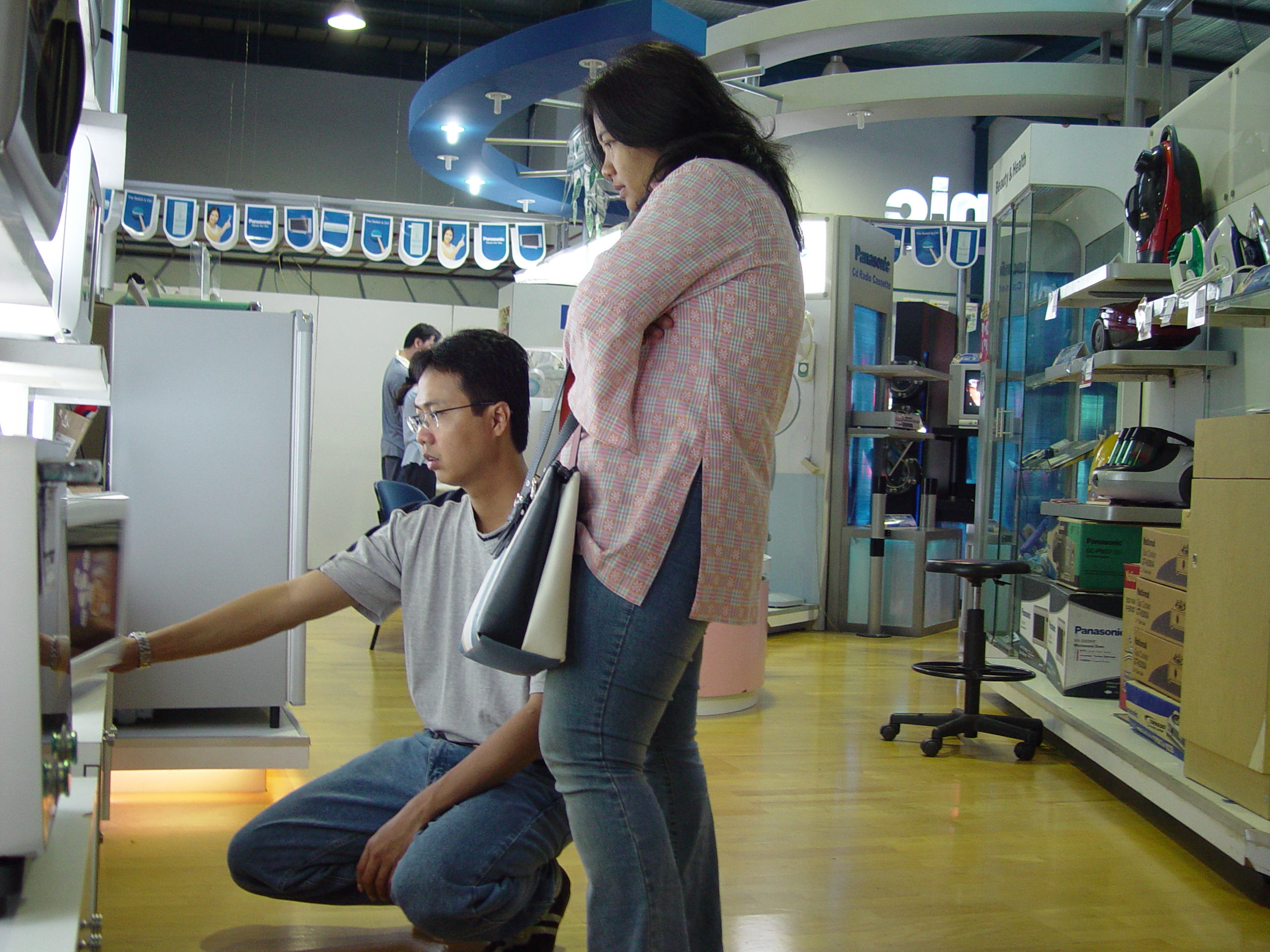
People buying home electronics at a shopping mall in Jakarta, Indonesia

Consumption refers to the use of resources to fulfill present needs and desires. It is seen in contrast to investing, which is spending for the acquisition of future income. Consumption is a major concept in economics and is also studied in many other social sciences.

Different schools of economists define consumption differently. According to mainstream economists, only the final purchase of newly produced goods and services by individuals for immediate use constitutes consumption, while other types of expenditure – in particular, fixed investment, intermediate consumption, and government spending – are placed in separate categories (see consumer choice). Other economists define consumption more broadly as the aggregate of all economic activity that does not entail the design, production, and marketing of goods and services (e.g., the selection, adoption, use, disposal, and recycling of goods and services).

Economists are particularly interested in the relationship between consumption and income, as modelled with the consumption function. A similar realist structural view can be found in consumption theory, which views the Fisherian intertemporal choice framework as the real structure of the consumption function. Unlike the passive strategy of structure embodied in inductive structural realism, economists define structure in terms of its invariance under intervention.

In sociology, consumption refers to consumer behavior in responses to goods and services. Theories of consumption have been a part of the field of sociology since its earliest days, dating back, at least implicitly, to the work of Karl Marx in the mid-to-late nineteenth century. Sociologists view consumption as central to everyday life, identity and social order. Many sociologists associate it with social class, identity, group membership, age and stratification as it plays a huge part in modernity. Thorstein Veblen's (1899) The Theory of the Leisure Class is generally seen as the first major theoretical work to take consumption as its primary focus. Despite these early roots, research on consumption began in earnest in the second half of the twentieth century in Europe, especially Great Britain. Interest in the topic among mainstream US sociologists was much slower to develop and it is still not a focal concern of many American sociologists. Efforts are currently underway to form a section in the American Sociological Association devoted to the study of consumption.

However, over the last twenty years, sociological research into the area of consumption has burgeoned in cognate fields, particularly in global and cultural studies:

The processes associated with globalization have created hitherto unimaginable opportunities for cultural forms and practices to travel far beyond the indigenous sites and spaces in which they were first conceived and produced. While there have always been cultural movements and flows from one space to another, the intensity and ease of contemporary intersections of the global and the local have forced scholars to look closely at the myriad ways in which culture is consumed – used up, made sense of, embraced, and explored.

Modern theorists of consumption include Jean Baudrillard, Pierre Bourdieu, and George Ritzer.

== Behavioural economics, Keynesian consumption function ==
The Keynesian consumption function is also known as the absolute income hypothesis, as it only bases consumption on current income and ignores potential future income (or lack of). Criticism of this assumption led to the development of Milton Friedman's permanent income hypothesis and Franco Modigliani's life cycle hypothesis.

More recent theoretical approaches are based on behavioural economics and suggest that a number of behavioural principles can be taken as microeconomic foundations for a behaviourally-based aggregate consumption function.

Behavioural economics also adopts and explains several human behavioural traits within the constraint of the standard economic model. These include bounded rationality, bounded willpower, and bounded selfishness.

Bounded rationality was first proposed by Herbert Simon. This means that people sometimes respond rationally to their own cognitive limits, which aimed to minimize the sum of the costs of decision making and the costs of error. In addition, bounded willpower refers to the fact that people often take actions that they know are in conflict with their long-term interests. For example, most smokers would rather not smoke, and many smokers willing to pay for a drug or a program to help them quit. Finally, bounded self-interest refers to an essential fact about the utility function of a large part of people: under certain circumstances, they care about others or act as if they care about others, even strangers.

== Consumption and household production ==
Aggregate consumption is a component of aggregate demand.

Consumption is defined in part by comparison to production. In the tradition of the Columbia School of Household Economics, and known as the New Home Economics, commercial consumption has to be analyzed in the context of household production. The opportunity cost of time affects the cost of home-produced substitutes and therefore demand for commercial goods and services. The elasticity of demand for consumption goods is also a function of who performs chores in households and how their spouses compensate them for opportunity costs of home production.

Different schools of economists define production and consumption differently. According to mainstream economists, only the final purchase of goods and services by individuals constitutes consumption, while other types of expenditure – in particular, fixed investment, intermediate consumption, and government spending – are placed in separate categories (See consumer choice). Other economists define consumption much more broadly, as the aggregate of all economic activity that does not entail the design, production and marketing of goods and services (e.g., the selection, adoption, use, disposal and recycling of goods and services).

Consumption can also be measured in a variety of different ways such as energy in energy economics metrics.

== Consumption as part of GDP ==
GDP (Gross domestic product) is defined via this formula:

$Y=C+G+I+NX$

Where $C$ stands for consumption.

Where $G$ stands for total government spending. (including salaries)

Where $I$ stands for Investments.

Where $NX$ stands for net exports. Net exports are exports minus imports.

In most countries consumption is the most important part of GDP. It usually ranges from 45% from GDP to 85% of GDP.

== Consumption in microeconomics ==
In microeconomics, consumer choice is a theory that assumes that people are rational consumers and they decide on what combinations of goods to buy based on their utility function (which goods provide them with more use/happiness) and their budget constraint (which combinations of goods they can afford to buy). Consumers try to maximize utility while staying within the limits of their budget constrain or to minimize cost while getting the target level of utility. A special case of this is the consumption-leisure model where a consumer chooses between a combination of leisure and working time, which is represented by income.

However, behavioural economics shows that consumers do not behave rationally and they are influenced by factors other than their utility from the given good. Those factors can be the popularity of a given good or its position in a supermarket.

== Consumption in macroeconomics ==
In macroeconomics in the theory of national accounts consumption is not only the amount of money that is spent by households on goods and services from companies, but also the expenditures of government that are meant to provide things for citizens they would have to buy themselves otherwise. This means things like healthcare. Where consumption is equal to income minus savings. Consumption can be calculated via this formula:

$C=C_0+c*Y_d$

Where $C_0$ stands for autonomous consumption which is minimal consumption of household that is achieved always, by either reducing the savings of household or by borrowing money.

$c$ is marginal propensity to consume where $c \in [0,1]$ and it reveals how much of household income is spent on consumption.

$Y_d$ is the disposable income of the household.

== Consumption as a measurement of growth ==
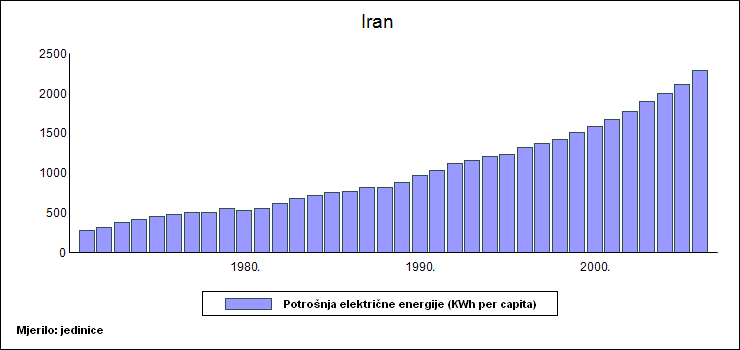
Consumption of electric energy is positively correlated with economical growth. As electric energy is one of the most important inputs of the economy. Electric energy is needed to produce goods and to provide services to consumers. There is a statistically significant effect of electrical energy consumption and economic growth that is positive. Electricity consumption reflects economic growth. With the gradual rise of people's material level, electric energy consumption is also gradually increasing. In Iran, for example, electricity consumption has increased along with economic growth since 1970. But as countries continue to develop this effect is decreasing as they optimize their production, by getting more energy-efficient equipment. Or by transferring parts of their production to foreign nations where the cost of electrical energy is smaller.

== Main factors of consumption ==
The determinant factors affecting consumption studied by economists include:

Income: Economists consider the income level to be the most crucial factor affecting consumption. Therefore, the offered consumption functions often emphasize this variable. Keynes considers absolute income, Duesenberry considers relative income, and Friedman considers permanent income as factors that determine one's consumption.

Consumer expectations: Changes in the prices would change the real income and purchasing power of the consumer. If the consumer's expectations about future prices change, it can change his consumption decisions in the present period.

Consumer assets and wealth: These refer to assets in the form of cash, bank deposits, securities, as well as physical assets such as stocks of durable goods or real estate such as houses, land, etc. These factors can affect consumption; if the mentioned assets are sufficiently liquid, they will remain in reserve and can be used in emergencies.

Consumer credits: The increase in the consumer's credit and his credit transactions can allow the consumer to use his future income at present. As a result, it can lead to more consumption expenditure compared to the case that the only purchasing power is current income.

Interest rate: Fluctuations in interest rates can affect household consumption decisions. An increase in interest rates increases people's savings and, as a result, reduces their consumption expenditures.

Household size: Households' absolute consumption costs increase as the number of family members increases. Although for some goods, as the number of households increases, the consumption of such goods would increase relatively less than the number of households. This happens due to the phenomena of the economy of scale.

Social groups: Household consumption varies in different social groups. For example, the consumption pattern of employers is different from the consumption pattern of workers. The smaller the gap between groups in a society, the more homogeneous consumption pattern within the society.

Consumer taste: One of the important factors in shaping the consumption pattern is consumer taste. This factor, to some extent, can affect other factors such as income and price levels. On the other hand, society's culture has a significant impact on shaping the tastes of consumers.

Area: Consumption patterns are different in different geographical regions. For example, this pattern differs from urban and rural areas, crowded and sparsely populated areas, economically active and inactive areas, etc.

== Consumption theories ==
Consumption theories began with John Maynard Keynes in 1936 and were developed by economists such as Friedman, Dusenbery, and Modigliani. The relationship between consumption and income was a crucial concept in macroeconomic analysis for a long time.

=== Absolute Income Hypothesis ===
In his 1936 General Theory, Keynes introduced the consumption function. He believed that various factors influence consumption decisions; But in the short run, the most important factor is real income. According to the Absolute Income Hypothesis, consumer spending on consumption goods and services is a linear function of his current disposable income.

=== Relative Income Hypothesis ===
James Duesenberry proposed this model in 1949. This theory is based on two assumptions:

1. People's consumption behavior is not independent of each other. In other words, two people with the same income that live in two different positions within the income distribution will have different consumptions. In fact, one compares oneself with other people, and what has a significant impact on one's consumption is one's position among individuals and groups in society; Therefore, a person only feels an improvement in his situation in terms of consumption if his average consumption increases relative to the average level of society. This phenomenon is called the Demonstration Effect.
2. Consumer behavior over time is irreversible. This means that when income declines, consumer spending is sticky to the former level. After getting used to a level of consumption, a person shows resistance to reducing it and is unwilling to reduce that level of consumption. This phenomenon is called the ratchet effect.

=== Intertemporal consumption ===
The model of intertemporal consumption was first thought of by John Rae in 1830s and it was later expanded by Irving Fisher in 1930s in the book Theory of interest. This model describes how consumption is distributed over periods of life. In the basic model with 2 periods for example young and old age.

$S_1=Y_1 - C_1$

And then

$C_2 = Y_2 + S_1 \times (1+r)$

Where $C$ is the consumption in a given year.

Where $Y$ is the income received in a given year.

Where $S$ are saving from a given year.

Where $r$ is the interest rate.

Indexes 1,2 stand for period 1 and period 2.

This model can be expanded to represent each year of a lifetime.

=== Permanent income hypothesis ===
The permanent income hypothesis was developed by Milton Friedman in the 1950s in his book A theory of the Consumption Function. This theory divides income into two components: $Y_t$ is transitory income and $Y_p$ is permanent income, such that $Y = Y_t + Y_p$.

Changes in the two components have different impacts on consumption. If $Y_p$ changes then consumption changes accordingly by $\alpha \times Y_p$, where $\alpha$ is known as the marginal propensity to consume. If we expect part of income to be saved or invested, then $\alpha \in (0, 1)$, otherwise $\alpha = 1$. On the other hand, if $Y_t$ changes (for example as a result of winning the lottery), then this increase in income is distributed over the remaining lifespan. For example, winning $1000 with the expectation of living for 10 more years will result in yearly increase of consumption by $100.

=== Life-cycle hypothesis ===
The life-cycle hypothesis was published by Franco Modigliani in 1966. It describes how people make consumption decisions based on their past income, current income, and future income as they tend to distribute their consumption over their lifetime. It is, in its basic form:

$C=1/T \times W + 1/T \times (R\times Y)$

Where $C$ is the consumption in given year.

Where $T$ is the number of years the individual is going to live for.

Where $R$ is for how many more years will the individual be working.

Where $Y$ is the average wage the individual will be paid over their remaining work time

And $W$ is the wealth he has already accumulated in their life.

=== Access-based consumption ===
The term "access-based consumption" refers to the increasing extent to which people seek the experience of temporarily accessing goods rather than owning them, thus there are opportunities for a "sharing economy" to develop, although Bardhi and Eckhardt outline differences between "access" and "sharing". Social theorist Jeremy Rifkin put forward the idea in his 2000 publication The Age of Access.

== Old-age spending ==
Spending the Kids' Inheritance (originally the title of a book on the subject by Annie Hulley) and the acronyms SKI and SKI'ing refer to the growing number of older people in Western society spending their money on travel, cars and property, in contrast to previous generations who tended to leave that money to their children. According to a study from 2017 that was conducted in the USA 20% of married people consider leaving inheritance a priority, while 34% do not consider it as a priority. And about one in ten unmarried Americans (14 percent) plan to spend their retirement money to improve their lives, rather than saving it to leave an inheritance to their children. In addition, three in ten married Americans (28 percent) have downsized or plan to downsize their home after retirement.

Die Broke (from the book Die Broke: A Radical Four-Part Financial Plan by Stephen Pollan and Mark Levine) is a similar idea.

== Definitions of consumption ==
The sociology of consumption is a field within sociology specifically about the social, economic, and cultural dimensions of consumer behavior. It studies how and why individuals and groups acquire and use goods and services in a given society, as well as the cultural meanings and social norms associated with these practices.

When defining consumption, there must be a focus on the consumer, their relationships, and the process of consumption itself. When considering the consumer’s role in consumption, there is an emphasis on the moment of exchange of a good or service as well as stressing the importance of considering the consumer as an individual within a socially constructed environment. The process of consumption itself takes into account how activities are socially constructed and organized. Other definitions of consumption necessitate a process that creates utility, agency, and appropriation (in the sense that a raw material is processed, handled, or transformed by humans). For instance, infants cannot consume because they lack agency; instead, their parents consume for them. An example of appropriation is purchasing a Christmas tree–although it is a natural object, it has been processed by others and therefore consumed by those who purchase it. On the other hand, if one were to go into their backyard, chop a fir themselves, and then bring it into the home, arguably, that is not an act of consumption.

The academic debate surrounding definitions of consumption include whether or not consumption is an active choice or an action carried out simply due to habit or circumstance. Though individualism and identity is highly intertwined with practices of consumption, so are the economic conditions that obstruct agency for marginalized groups and individuals.

In "Consumption, Food and Taste" (1997), sociologist Alan Warde defines consumption as "the process by which goods and services are acquired, used and disposed of by households and other economic actors" (p. 3). He emphasizes that consumption involves not just the physical act of purchasing and consuming goods, but also the cultural meanings and social norms that are associated with these practices, including economic conditions, new technologies, and cultural trends. Moreover, consumption has significant implications for social inequality, as patterns of consumption are often tied to broader patterns of social stratification.

== History of consumption ==
Consumption patterns have a direct link to ways in which people interact with the environment. What people eat and wear, what types of homes people live in, and where people even buy groceries all have impacts on the environment. This immense stratification of impact has a long history that has roots in the Industrial Revolution, imperialism, the World Wars, and much more especially as the global population has grown rapidly in recent centuries.

=== Pre–Industrial Revolution ===
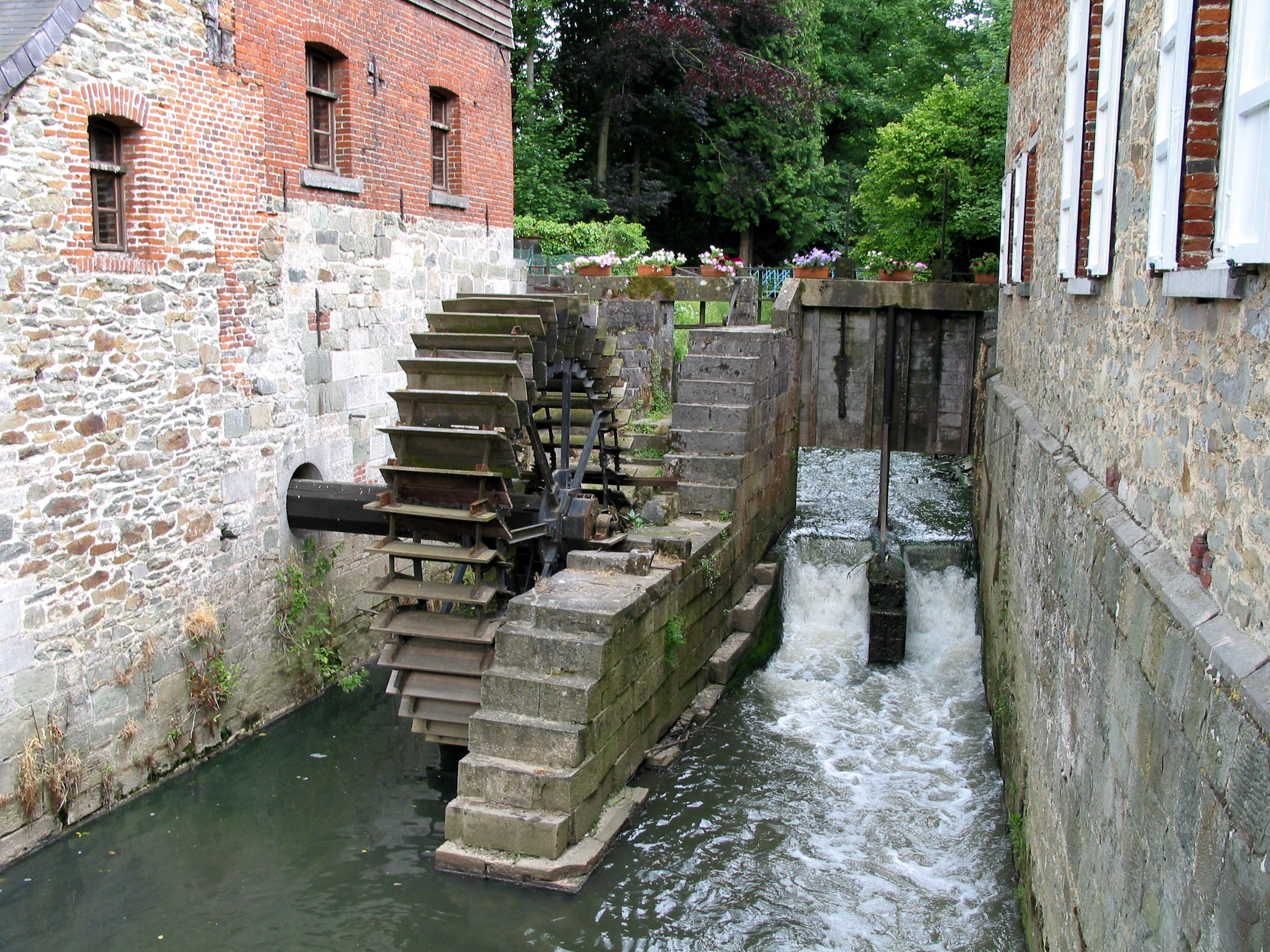
Watermill

Before the Industrial Revolution, consumption looked very different. Around the world, consumption patterns revolved largely around what food could be grown and brought into the villages, towns, and cities of the day. Additionally, prior to the Industrial Revolution, the steam engine had yet to be invented and fossil fuels had yet to truly be revolutionizing. So, production was significantly limited to the fuel that could be found consisting of wood, peat, or possibly watermill power. Collectively, these limitations prohibited a majority of the global population from being able to consume in excess. Excess consumption was reserved for the global elites.

=== During the Industrial Revolution ===
Starting during the Industrial Revolution, consumption patterns changed drastically around the world. For the countries getting industrialized first, cheap mass-produced goods combined with new steady and rising wages. People in countries like England, the United States, and France began to be able to buy more commodities with the more expendable income they had. This pattern only grew exponentially as time moved toward the present. In contrast to the individuals in industrializing countries, people in the colonies of the colonial industrializing powers became dumping grounds for the overproduction of commodities.

Subsequently, production overall grew exponentially as industrial production transitioned into the backbone of the global economy. Everyday people began having more things and more specifically, more uniform mass-produced things. As more and more people began having more and more things, the raw resources and the consequences of production grew as well. These production-based consequences include but are in no way limited to immense deforestation, overhunting of different animal populations (beaver hunting), and exploitative and destructive mining and resource extraction processes.

=== Post-Industrial Revolution ===
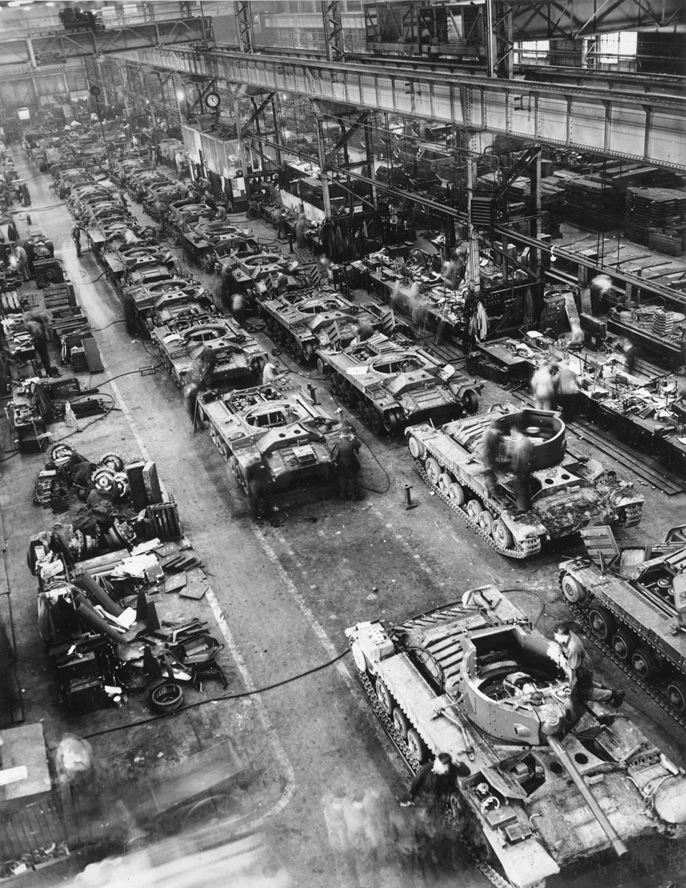
Tank assembly during WWII

From the time of the Industrial Revolution until World War II, there were significant differences in consumption patterns between those in the industrialized world and those in the unindustrialized world. Yet, those differences got exacerbated during World War II and in the immediate postwar years. Driven by the United States’ monumental industrial capacity, the world exited the Second World War with a new jump in industrialization and mass production. Consumption during World War II was altered globally due to so many resources going to the war effort. However, after the war, the factories still intact switched to consumer goods to avoid an economic slowdown. For the United States with all of its industrial capacity unharmed, the United States became an industrial titan producing mass-consumption goods for the whole world. Additionally through the Marshall Plan, an American foreign policy aid program aimed at preventing broken European nations from becoming Communist by supporting a capitalist revitalization with immense economic support from the United States, European nations rebuilt extremely quickly and were able to modernize their industrial systems toward mass production as well.

People all around the world had American and Western European goods flowing in during the second half of the 20th century. The Western goods enabled a new level of consumption where people could now have cheap American corn, Spam, Ford cars, and American electronics. While people around the world were seeing the “Made in America” stamp more and more frequently, a mirrored impact is that Americans of all classes were becoming richer in comparison. This increase in wealth allowed for the increase in stratification between Americans and largely the rest of the world. Americans could now afford to consume large amounts of everything.

=== Divergence in American consumption vs European consumption ===
Map of the National System of Interstate and Defense Highways, June of 1958

When looking at American cities, they look remarkably different to cities around the world. These drastic differences have a lot of causes yet they all lead to cities that have on average significantly higher levels of per capita consumption than others around the world. Stemming largely from the post-World War II divergence, the United States built much of its prosperity on its national demand for mass-consumption goods whereas Europe built theirs largely around exports. This divergence is exhibited in how American and European cities function and look. Americans, and subsequently American economic trends, tend to be significantly more self-centered and personal while European economic trends tend to be more community-based. These differences can best be seen in governmental policy toward taxation and public spending. In the United States, people tend to dislike public spending and taxation while Europeans tend to support higher rates of taxation for spending on the public good. Additionally, when looking at how American cities look vs European cities, this divergent ideology around public vs private living and responsibility is extremely clear. Look at how Americans have embraced suburbia as a major way of living. With suburbia comes single-family homes, private cars, and massive supermarkets. All entities that prioritize and enable hyper-individualized (and often redundant) consumption. American living is epitomized by urban sprawl, where cities have grown outwards rather than upwards. Various American governmental policies have enabled and encouraged urban sprawl. For example, President Eisenhower implemented the Federal Aid Highway Act in 1956 and paved the way for a substantial highway system to be implemented across the nation. These highways, coupled with the uniquely American ability at the time for the average family to afford a car, provided the necessary infrastructure to accelerate and accommodate a massive shift into the suburbs. In the suburbs, families could have their own private single-family house, a backyard, and personal appliances such as refrigerators, dishwashers, and laundry machines. This focus on personal single-family homes led to this very individualistic and socially repetitive pattern of consumption in the United States.

Conversely, Europe embraced a more collectivist community-based approach to living that does not necessitate the same level of hyper-consumption. Europe has a much higher population density prioritizing multi-family units. This polar opposite urban planning allowed most European cities to subside off less consumption per capita. Whereas in America, strict urban planning restrictions limited who could live where and where businesses could be, in Europe, there was a much more lenient system that allowed for and encouraged a much higher population density.

== Consumer culture ==
One major area of research within the sociology of consumption is the study of consumer culture. This includes analyzing the ways in which consumer goods and services are marketed, consumed, and integrated into social identities and cultural practices. Scholars in this area have examined the role of advertising, branding, and other forms of commercial communication in shaping consumer desires and preferences.

Consumer Culture Theory (CCT) maintains that consumption practices contribute to the creation and maintenance of an identity, contrary to Bourdieu’s theory that one’s consumption patterns are rooted in their upbringing and environment. Consumption through the lens of CCT is not only shaped by external factors (such as socioeconomic status, marketing, and upbringing) but also is rooted in individual agency. However, even though CCT credits individual agency to influence patterns of consumption, relationships, networks, and changing societal norms are also sources of influence. CCT also relates to the idea of the “extended self” which is a construction of identity created with external objects. For instance, a fashion blogger may consider their clothes to be an extension of themself. They chose clothes that they liked, bought them (or made them), and wear them to signal their identity. In this way, the “you are what you eat” sentiment can be extended to other things that you consume, whether it be clothes, art, books, computers, etc.

Sociologist Alan Warde suggests that goods and services can be understood as a form of cultural capital, in which individuals use these products to signal their social status and cultural tastes to others. He argues that the consumption of goods and services is often driven by a desire to participate in particular cultural scenes or communities, and to gain recognition and approval from others within these contexts. In this sense, goods and services are seen as part of a broader system of cultural signifiers, in which individuals use a range of material and symbolic objects to communicate their identity and social position. Warde suggests that the meanings and values associated with particular goods and services can change over time, and that these meanings are often contested and negotiated.

Considering advertisements and branding, Jens Beckert’s Imagined Futures sheds light on the potency of symbolic value. Symbolic value is defined as the value derived from the symbolic meaning of an object. For instance, a stuffed animal from childhood has little physical value (in that the toy itself is not necessarily worth much or do much), but can have high symbolic value to the owner because they have ascribed emotions of comfort and nostalgia to the toy. Advertising and branding has tapped into how consumers value products, and ascribe non-function related meanings to the goods and services. For instance, many dog food commercials symbolize their product to be a lifeforce for pets, keeping them happy and healthy for as long as possible, when in reality pet food is just pet food. Branding in itself can be considered as a construction of symbolic meaning attached to an entity, whether it be a company or a person. For example, Nike as a brand represents perseverance and athletic achievement, especially through their tagline, “just do it,” even though they cannot sell perseverance or athletic success. They sell athletic products, but are successful as a brand because of their advertising with some of the greatest athletes of all time and through imbuing their brand with meaning that permeates through the general public.

== See also ==
- Aggregate demand
- Consumer debt
- Classification of Individual Consumption by Purpose (COICOP)
- Consumer choice
- Consumer theory
- Consumerism – Acquisition of goods beyond essential needs
- Hypermobility (travel) – Act of taking frequent trips
- Life cycle hypothesis
- Measures of national income and output
- Overconsumption – Resource use exceeding carrying capacity
- Permanent income hypothesis
- Waste – Unwanted or unusable materials
- List of largest consumer markets
