= Liquidity constraint =

Limiting or increasing the cost of borrowing capital

In economics, a liquidity constraint is a form of imperfection in the capital market which imposes a limit on the amount an individual can borrow, or an alteration in the interest rate they pay. By raising the cost of borrowing or restricting the amount of borrowing, it prevents individuals from fully optimising their behaviour over time, as studied by theories of intertemporal consumption. The liquidity constraint affects the ability of households to transfer resources across time periods, as well as across uncertain states of nature, relative to income.

Mortgage lending is the cheapest way of an individual borrowing money, but is only available to people with enough savings to buy property. Because the loan is secured on a house or other property, it is only accessible to particular individuals (those who have enough savings to put down a down payment). Other forms of credit, like unsecured loans, credit cards and loan sharks, have progressively higher interest rates, and are used more by poorer people.

== See also ==
- Finance charge
