= Life-cycle hypothesis =

Model of economic consumption

In economics, the life-cycle hypothesis (LCH) is a model that strives to explain the consumption patterns of individuals.

== Theory and evidence ==
Elderly dissaving is also influenced by the present factors that materially prevent them from the possibility of spending their previous savings. One of them is the loss of the driving license. An extended survey held in 1998, 2000, and 2002 among the U.S. retired citizens highlighted that "about 90% of the trips among people older than age 65 are in a private vehicle" and that driving cessation was highly correlated (46% to 63%, Tobit regression) to a reduction in spending on non basic needs such as trips, tickets, and dinings out.

It is also relevant to distinguish elderly poor people in two basic typologies: people who are poor on income, or those who are poor in terms of both income and consumption. While the life cycle hypothesis predicts the income and the consumption patterns of the elderly population, a series of research papers published in the 2000s highlighted the role of other factors in making the elderly class of people among the income-poor alone, and not people who are both income and consumption-poor. It is the latter class of people the one who is the poorest among the older population. Those influencing factors are: the stock of assets and particularly the house property, the racial and scholarly background as well as the presence of family assistance network.

According to another extended survey collected among "disadvantaged groups such as rural, female, less educated individuals" in Burkina Faso, the spread of mobile and easy-to-transfer money doesn't show any correlation with the level of saving for predictable events occurring in the future (such as consumption patterns during the age of retirement), while it increases the propensity to save for personal health emergencies and, in the second instance, for unpredictable events.
