= Sonnenschein–Mantel–Debreu theorem =

Economic theorem

The Sonnenschein–Mantel–Debreu theorem is an important result in general equilibrium economics, proved by Gérard Debreu, Rolf Mantel, and Hugo F. Sonnenschein in the 1970s. It states that the excess demand curve for an exchange economy populated with utility-maximizing rational agents can take the shape of any function that is continuous, has homogeneity degree zero, and is in accordance with Walras's law. This implies that the excess demand function does not take a well-behaved form even if each agent has a well-behaved utility function. Market processes will not necessarily reach a unique and stable equilibrium point.

More recently, Jordi Andreu, Pierre-André Chiappori, and Ivar Ekeland extended this result to market demand curves, both for individual commodities and for the aggregate demand of an economy as a whole. (Note: The literature on the Sonnenschein–Mantel–Debreu results generally does not distinguish between the market demand curve for a single commodity, and the aggregate demand curve for an economy with many different commodities. The results have been proven to hold for any market in which there are at least as many agents as there are commodities, so it trivially follows that they apply to any non-empty market for a single commodity.) This means that demand curves may take on highly irregular shapes, even if all individual agents in the market are perfectly rational. In contrast with usual assumptions, the quantity demanded of a commodity may not decrease when the price increases. Frank Hahn regarded the theorem as a dangerous critique of mainstream neoclassical economics.

== Formal statement ==
There are several possible versions of the theorem that differ in detailed bounds and assumptions.

The following version is formulated in the Arrow–Debreu model of economy. For the notation, see the Arrow–Debreu model page.

Theorem—Let $N$ be a positive integer. If $Z: \{p\in \R_N: \sum_n p_n = 1, \forall n, p_n > 0\} \to \R^N$ is a continuous function that satisfies Walras's law, then there exists an economy with households indexed by $I$, with no producers ("pure exchange economy"), and household endowments $\{r^i\}_{i\in I}$ such that each household satisfies all assumptions in the "Assumptions" section, and $Z$ is the excess demand function for the economy.

Similarly, changing $Z$ to a set-valued, closed graph function, we obtain another

Theorem—Let $N$ be a positive integer. If $Z: \{p\in \R_N: \sum_n p_n = 1, \forall n, p_n > 0\} \to \R^N$ is a set-valued function with closed graph that satisfies Walras's law, then there exists an economy with households indexed by $I$, with no producers ("pure exchange economy"), and household endowments $\{r^i\}_{i\in I}$ such that each household satisfies all assumptions in the "Assumptions" section except the "strict convexity" assumption, and $Z$ is the excess demand function for the economy.

== History of the proof ==
The concept of an excess demand function is important in general equilibrium theories, because it acts as a signal for the market to adjust prices. If the value of the excess demand function is positive, then more units of a commodity are being demanded than can be supplied; there is a shortage. If excess demand is negative, then more units are being supplied than are demanded; there is a glut. The assumption is that the rate of change of prices will be proportional to excess demand, so that the adjustment of prices will eventually lead to an equilibrium state in which excess demand for all commodities is zero.

In the 1970s, mathematical economists worked to establish rigorous microfoundations for widely used equilibrium models, on the basis of the assumption that individuals are utility-maximizing rational agents (the "utility hypothesis"). It was already known that this assumption put certain loose restrictions on the excess demand functions for individuals (continuity and Walras's law), and that these restrictions were "inherited" by the market excess demand function. In a 1973 paper, Hugo Sonnenschein posed the question of whether these were the only restrictions that could be placed on a market excess demand function. He conjectured that the answer was "yes," and made preliminary steps toward proving it. These results were extended by Rolf Mantel, and then by Gérard Debreu in 1974, who proved that, as long as there are at least as many agents in the market as there are commodities, the market excess demand function inherits only the following properties of individual excess demand functions:

- Continuity
- Homogeneity of degree zero, and
- Walras's law

These inherited properties are not sufficient to guarantee that the excess demand curve is downward-sloping, as is usually assumed. The uniqueness of the equilibrium point is also not guaranteed. There may be more than one price vector at which the excess demand function is zero, which is the standard definition of equilibrium in this context.

=== Further developments ===
In the wake of these initial publications, several scholars have extended the initial Sonnenschein–Mantel–Debreu results in a variety of ways. In a 1976 paper, Rolf Mantel showed that the theorem still holds even if the very strong assumption is added that all consumers have homothetic preferences. This means that the utility that consumers assign to a commodity will always be exactly proportional to the amount of the commodity offered; for example, one million oranges would be valued exactly one million times more than one orange. Furthermore, Alan Kirman and Karl-Josef Koch proved in 1986 that the SMD theorem still holds even if all agents are assumed to have identical preferences, and the distribution of income is assumed to be fixed across time and independent of prices. The only income distribution that is not permissible is a uniform one where all individuals have the same income and therefore, since they have the same preferences, they are all identical.

For a while it was unclear whether SMD-style results also applied to the aggregate market demand curve itself, and not just the excess demand curve. But in 1982 Jordi Andreu established an important preliminary result suggesting that this was the case, and in 1999 Pierre-André Chiappori and Ivar Ekeland used vector calculus to prove that the Sonnenschein–Mantel–Debreu results do indeed apply to the market demand curve. This means that the aggregate market demand curve may take on highly irregular shapes, even if all individual agents in the economy are perfectly rational.

== Significance ==
In the 1982 book Handbook of Mathematical Economics, Hugo Sonnenschein explained some of the implications of his theorem for general equilibrium theory:

A possible market demand curve according to the Sonnenschein–Mantel–Debreu results

…market demand functions need not satisfy in any way the classical restrictions which characterize consumer demand functions… The importance of the above results is clear: strong restrictions are needed in order to justify the hypothesis that a market demand function has the characteristics of a consumer demand function. Only in special cases can an economy be expected to act as an ‘idealized consumer.’ The utility hypothesis tells us nothing about market demand unless it is augmented by additional requirements.

In other words, it cannot be assumed that the demand curve for an entire economy must be smoothly downward-sloping simply because the demand curves of individual consumers are downward-sloping. This is an instance of the more general aggregation problem, which deals with the theoretical difficulty of modeling the behavior of large groups of individuals in the same way that an individual is modeled.

Frank Ackerman points out that it is a corollary of Sonnenschein–Mantel–Debreu that a Walrasian auction will not always find a unique and stable equilibrium, even in ideal conditions:

In Walrasian general equilibrium, prices are adjusted through a tâtonnement ('groping') process: the rate of change for any commodity’s price is proportional to the excess demand for the commodity, and no trades take place until equilibrium prices have been reached. This may not be realistic, but it is mathematically tractable: it makes price movements for each commodity depend only on information about that commodity. Unfortunately, as the SMD theorem shows, tâtonnement does not reliably lead to convergence to equilibrium.

Léon Walras' auction model requires that the price of a commodity will always rise in response to excess demand, and that it will always fall in response to an excess supply. But SMD shows that this will not always be the case, because the excess demand function need not be uniformly downward-sloping.

The theorem has also raised concerns about the falsifiability of general equilibrium theory, because it seems to imply that almost any observed pattern of market price and quantity data could be interpreted as being the result of individual utility-maximizing behavior. In other words, Sonnenschein–Mantel–Debreu raises questions about the degree to which general equilibrium theory can produce testable predictions about aggregate market variables. For this reason, Andreu Mas-Colell referred to the theorem as the “Anything Goes Theorem” in his graduate-level microeconomics textbook. Some economists have made attempts to address this problem, with Donald Brown and Rosa Matzkin deriving some polynomial restrictions on market variables by modeling the equilibrium state of a market as a topological manifold. However, Abu Turab Rizvi comments that this result does not practically change the situation very much, because Brown and Matzkin's restrictions are formulated on the basis of individual-level observations about budget constraints and incomes, while general equilibrium models purport to explain changes in aggregate market-level data.

Robert Solow interprets the theorem as showing that, for modelling macroeconomic growth, the dynamic stochastic general equilibrium is no more microfounded than simpler models such as the Solow–Swan model. As long as a macroeconomic growth model assumes an excess demand function satisfying continuity, homogeneity, and Walras's law, it can be microfounded.

The Sonnenschein–Mantel–Debreu results have led some economists, such as Werner Hildenbrand and Alan Kirman, to abandon the project of explaining the characteristics of the market demand curve on the basis of individual rationality. Instead, these authors attempt to explain the law of demand in terms of the organization of society as a whole, and in particular the distribution of income.

== Explanation ==
In mathematical terms, the number of equations that make up a market excess demand function is equal to the number of individual excess demand functions, which in turn equals the number of prices to be solved for. By Walras's law, if all but one of the excess demands is zero then the last one has to be zero as well. This means that there is one redundant equation and we can normalize one of the prices or a combination of all prices (in other words, only relative prices are determined; not the absolute price level). Having done this, the number of equations equals the number of unknowns and we have a determinate system. However, because the equations are non-linear there is no guarantee of a unique solution. Furthermore, even though reasonable assumptions can guarantee that the individual excess-demand functions have a unique root, these assumptions do not guarantee that the aggregate demand does as well.

There are several things to be noted. First, even though there may be multiple equilibria, every equilibrium is still guaranteed, under standard assumptions, to be Pareto efficient. However, the different equilibria are likely to have different distributional implications and may be ranked differently by any given social welfare function. Second, by the Hopf index theorem, in regular economies the number of equilibria will be finite and all of them will be locally unique. This means that comparative statics, or the analysis of how the equilibrium changes when there are shocks to the economy, can still be relevant as long as the shocks are not too large. But this leaves the question of the stability of the equilibrium unanswered, since a comparative statics perspective does not tell us what happens when the market moves away from an equilibrium.

== Extension to incomplete markets ==
The extension to incomplete markets was first conjectured by Andreu Mas-Colell in 1986. To do this he remarks that Walras's law and homogeneity of degree zero can be understood as the fact that the excess demand only depends on the budget set itself. Hence, homogeneity is only saying that excess demand is the same if the budget sets are the same. This formulation extends to incomplete markets. So does Walras's law if seen as budget feasibility of excess-demand function. The first incomplete markets Sonnenschein–Mantel–Debreu type of result was obtained by Jean-Marc Bottazzi and Thorsten Hens. Other works expanded the type of assets beyond the popular real assets structures like Chiappori and Ekland. All such results are local. In 2003 Takeshi Momi extended the approach by Bottazzi and Hens as a global result.

== Bibliography ==
- Ackerman, Frank (2002). "Still dead after all these years: interpreting the failure of general equilibrium theory" (PDF). Journal of Economic Methodology. 9 (2): 119–139. doi:10.1080/13501780210137083. S2CID 154640384.
- Andreu, Jordi (1982). "Rationalization of Market Demand on Finite Domains". Journal of Economic Theory. 28 (1): 201–204. doi:10.1016/0022-0531(82)90100-4.
- Bottazzi, Jean-Marc; Hens, Thorsten (1996). "Excess-demand functions and incomplete market". Journal of Economic Theory. 68: 49–63. doi:10.1006/jeth.1996.0003.
- Brown, Donald J.; Matzkin, Rosa L. (1996). "Testable Restrictions on the Equilibrium Manifold". Econometrica. 64 (6): 1249–1262. doi:10.2307/2171830. JSTOR 2171830.
- Chiappori, Pierre-André; Ekeland, Ivar (1999). "Aggregation and Market Demand: An Exterior Differential Calculus Viewpoint". Econometrica. 67 (6): 1435–1457. doi:10.1111/1468-0262.00085. JSTOR 2999567.
- Chiappori, Pierre-André; Ekeland, Ivar; Kübler, Felix; Polemarchakis, Herakles M. (2004). "Testable implications of general equilibrium theory: a differentiable approach" (PDF). Journal of Mathematical Economics. 40 (1–2): 105–119. doi:10.1016/j.jmateco.2003.11.002.
- Debreu, Gérard (1974). "Excess-demand functions". Journal of Mathematical Economics. 1: 15–21. doi:10.1016/0304-4068(74)90032-9.
- Hahn, Frank (1975). "Revival of Political Economy - The Wrong Issues and the Wrong Argument". The Economic Record. 51 (135): 360–364. doi:10.1111/j.1475-4932.1975.tb00262.x.
- Hildenbrand, Werner (1994). Market Demand: Theory and Empirical Evidence. Princeton, NJ: Princeton University Press. ISBN 0-691-03428-1.
- Keen, Steve (2013). "Predicting the 'Global Financial Crisis': Post-Keynesian Macroeconomics". Economic Record. 89 (285): 228–254. doi:10.1111/1475-4932.12016. hdl:10.1111/1475-4932.12016. S2CID 154247190.
- Kirman, Alan P.; Koch, Karl-Josef (1986). "Market Excess Demand in Exchange Economies with Identical Preferences and Collinear Endowments". The Review of Economic Studies. 53 (3): 457–463. doi:10.2307/2297640. JSTOR 2297640.
- Kirman, Alan P. (1992). "Whom or What Does the Representative Individual Represent?". Journal of Economic Perspectives. 6 (2): 117–136. doi:10.1257/jep.6.2.117.
- Lavoie, Marc (2014). Post-Keynesian Economics: New Foundations. Northampton, MA: Edward Elgar Publishing, Inc. ISBN 978-1-84720-483-7.
- Mantel, Rolf (1974). "On the characterization of aggregate excess-demand". Journal of Economic Theory. 7 (3): 348–353. doi:10.1016/0022-0531(74)90100-8.
- Mantel, Rolf (1976). "Homothetic Preferences and Community Excess Demand Functions". Journal of Economic Theory. 12 (2): 197–201. doi:10.1016/0022-0531(76)90073-9.
- Mas-Colell, Andreu (1988). "Four lectures on the differentiable approach to general equilibrium theory". Mathematical Economics. Lecture Notes in Mathematics. Vol. 1330. pp. 19–49. doi:10.1007/BFb0078157. ISBN 978-3-540-50003-2.
- Momi, T. (2003). "Excess-Demand Functions with Incomplete Markets–A Global Result" (PDF). Journal of Economic Theory. 111 (2): 240–250. doi:10.1016/S0022-0531(03)00061-9.
- Rizvi, S. Abu Turab (2006). "The Sonnenschein-Mantel-Debreu Results after Thirty Years" (PDF). History of Political Economy. 38: 228–245. doi:10.1215/00182702-2005-024.
- Sonnenschein, Hugo (1972). "Market excess-demand functions". Econometrica. 40 (3): 549–563. doi:10.2307/1913184. JSTOR 1913184. S2CID 55002985.
- Sonnenschein, Hugo (1973). "Do Walras' identity and continuity characterize the class of community excess-demand functions?". Journal of Economic Theory. 6 (4): 345–354. doi:10.1016/0022-0531(73)90066-5.
- Sonnenschein, Hugo; Shafer, Wayne (1982). "Chapter 14 Market demand and excess demand functions". In Arrow, Kenneth J.; Intriligator, Michael D. (eds.). Market demand and excess demand functions. Handbook of Mathematical Economics. Handbook of Mathematical Economics. Vol. 2. pp. 671–693. doi:10.1016/S1573-4382(82)02009-8. ISBN 9780444861276.
