= Aggregate supply =

Economic concept

Aggregate supply curve showing the three ranges: Keynesian, Intermediate, and Classical. In the Classical range, the economy is producing at full employment.

In economics, aggregate supply (AS) or domestic final supply (DFS) is the total supply of goods and services that firms in a national economy plan on selling during a specific time period. It is the total amount of goods and services that firms are willing and able to sell at a given price level in an economy. Together with aggregate demand it serves as one of two components for the AD–AS model.

== Analysis ==
There are two main reasons why the amount of aggregate output supplied might rise as price level P rises, i.e., why the AS curve is upward sloping:

- The short-run AS curve is drawn given some nominal variables such as the nominal wage rate, which is assumed fixed in the short run. Thus, a higher price level P implies a lower real wage rate and thus an incentive to produce more output. In the neoclassical long run, on the other hand, the nominal wage rate varies with economic conditions. (High unemployment leads to falling nominal wages which restore full employment.) Hence, in the long run, the aggregate supply curve is vertical.
- An alternative model starts with the notion that any economy involves a large number of heterogeneous types of inputs, including both fixed capital equipment and labour. Both main types of inputs can be unemployed. The upward-sloping AS curve arises because (1) some nominal input prices are fixed in the short run and (2) as output rises, more and more production processes encounter bottlenecks. At low levels of demand, there are large numbers of production processes that do not use their fixed capital equipment fully. Thus, production can be increased without much in the way of diminishing returns and the average price level need not rise much (if at all) to justify increased production. The AS curve is flat. On the other hand, when demand is high, few production processes have unemployed fixed inputs. Thus, bottlenecks are general. Any increase in demand and production induces increases in prices. Thus, the AS curve is steep or vertical.

== Different scopes ==
There are generally three alternative degrees of price-level responsiveness of aggregate supply. They are:

1. Short-run aggregate supply (SRAS) — During the short-run, firms possess one fixed factor of production (usually capital), and some factor input prices are sticky. The quantity of aggregate output supplied is highly sensitive to the price level, as seen in the flat region of the curve in the above diagram.
2. Long-run aggregate supply (LRAS) — Over the long run, only capital, labour, and technology affect the LRAS in the macroeconomic model because at this point everything in the economy is assumed to be used optimally. In most situations, the LRAS is viewed as static because it shifts the slowest of the three. The LRAS is shown as perfectly vertical, reflecting economists' belief that changes in aggregate demand (AD) have an only temporary change on the economy's total output.
3. Medium run aggregate supply (MRAS) — As an interim between SRAS and LRAS, the MRAS form slopes upward and reflects when capital, as well as labor usage, can change. More specifically, medium run aggregate supply is like this for three theoretical reasons, namely the Sticky-Wage Theory, the Sticky-Price Theory and the Misperception Theory. The position of the MRAS curve is affected by capital, labour, technology, and wage rate.

In the standard aggregate supply–aggregate demand model, real output (Y) is plotted on the horizontal axis and the price level (P) on the vertical axis. The levels of output and the price level are determined by the intersection of the aggregate supply curve with the downward-sloping aggregate demand curve.

== Data ==
In the United Kingdom, aggregate supply data is published in the Office for National Statistics' Input–output supply and use tables.

== Policy interventions ==
Aggregate supply is targeted by government "supply-side policies", which are intended to increase productive efficiency and hence national output. Some examples of supply-side policies include education and training, research and development, supporting small/medium enterprise, reducing business taxes, undertaking labour market reforms to diminish frictions that may hold down output, and investment in infrastructure. For example, the United Kingdom's 2011 Autumn Statement incorporated a series of supply-side measures which the government was undertaking "to rebalance and strengthen the economy in the medium term", which included extensive infrastructure investment and development of a more educated workforce. Supply-side reforms in the 2015 Budget addressed the nation's digital communications infrastructure, transport, energy and the environment. In a speech to the G20 in February 2016, Mark Carney, Governor of the Bank of England, urged G20 members "to develop a coherent and urgent approach to supply-side policies".

Continuing "supply-side reforms" were proposed by Liz Truss and Chancellor Kwasi Kwarteng as part of their 2022 economic programme, with reference to "a comprehensive package of supply-side reform and tax cuts" being made in the Growth Plan announced on 23 September 2022, and further supply side growth measures promised for October and early November, including measures affecting the planning system, business regulation, childcare, immigration, agricultural productivity and digital infrastructure. However, Larry Elliott in The Guardian has described this combination of reforms, reduced regulation and tax cuts as "one huge gamble". The September Growth Plan commitments were mostly reversed by the Autumn Statement of 17 November 2022, although a limited number of initiatives relating to "supply side growth" were included in the latter statement.

Within the UK government, HM Treasury's work on "the supply side" is led by the Enterprise and Growth Unit, working in conjunction with other government departments and public bodies. Sir John Kingman, a former civil servant who has been described as the "champion of HM Treasury's supply-side activism", has referred to concern with "the supply side" as the "third mission" of the Treasury, presenting former Chancellor of the Exchequer Nigel Lawson as a notable example of "those who believe in the importance of supply-side reform".

"Supply-side pessimism" reflects a concern that productive capacity is lost when unused (e.g. during a recession), so that the economy loses the ability to recover aggregate supply when demand recovers. For example, unused factories are not kept in a state of readiness to be used when an economic upturn begins, or workers miss out on the skills and training which they would normally acquire whilst in work. Spencer Dale, a British economist who sat on the Bank of England's Monetary Policy Committee between 2008 and 2014, took a pessimistic view of supply-side capabilities during the recession of 2012. Cambridge economist Bill Martin reported on productivity pessimism in 2012, noting that there was an established debate about whether there had been a permanent loss of productive capacity, which was reflected as a continuing level of "uncertainty ... related to the prospects for labour productivity and effective supply" as the economy recovered in 2013.

== See also ==
- Aggregate demand
- Aggregation problem
- Disequilibrium
- Economic surplus
- Effective demand
- Excess demand
- Excess demand function
- Excess supply
- Induced demand
- Keynesian formula
- Reproduction
- Scarcity
- Supply and demand
- Supply shock
