= Principles of Political Economy (disambiguation) =

Principles of Political Economy was a book written by John Stuart Mill.

It may also refer to:

- On the Principles of Political Economy and Taxation by David Ricardo
- Principles of Political Economy (Malthus) by Thomas Malthus
