= Via Trading (company) =

Wholesale company

Via Trading Corporation
- Company type: Private
- Industry: Wholesale Liquidation
- Headquarters: Los Angeles, California
- Key people: Jacques Stambouli, CEO & Alain Stambouli, President
- Website: http://www.viatrading.com/

Via Trading Corporation is a wholesale company of general liquidation consumer merchandise. The company's goods come primarily from wholesale liquidations, wholesale overstock purchases, and customer returns. Brothers Jacques and Alain Stambouli founded the company in June 2002, and Alain is the company's president, and Jacques is the CEO. Via Trading is based in Lynwood, California.

Via Trading began purchasing surplus inventory from retailers and wholesalers, but after realizing a void of good wholesale suppliers, the Stambouli brothers made a shift to the wholesale end of the business. Via Trading purchases large quantities of items at discount prices, similar to the business owners featured on A&E's Storage Wars, who purchase trailers of merchandise, and then resell the items at discount prices. Brandon Bernier of Storage Hunters purchased approximately $4,000 of merchandise from Via Trading in under 3 weeks in 2012.

Via Trading customers range from eBay sellers, Craigslist resellers, Amazon.com sellers, traditional retailers, flea market retailers and more. Via Trading has been nominated Preferred Flea Market Supplier by the National Flea Market Association. The company has been a member of the Better Business Bureau since 2003 and has been featured on The CW, ABC, NBC and Forbes, among other media outlets.
