= Excess supply =

Economic supply that exceeds demand

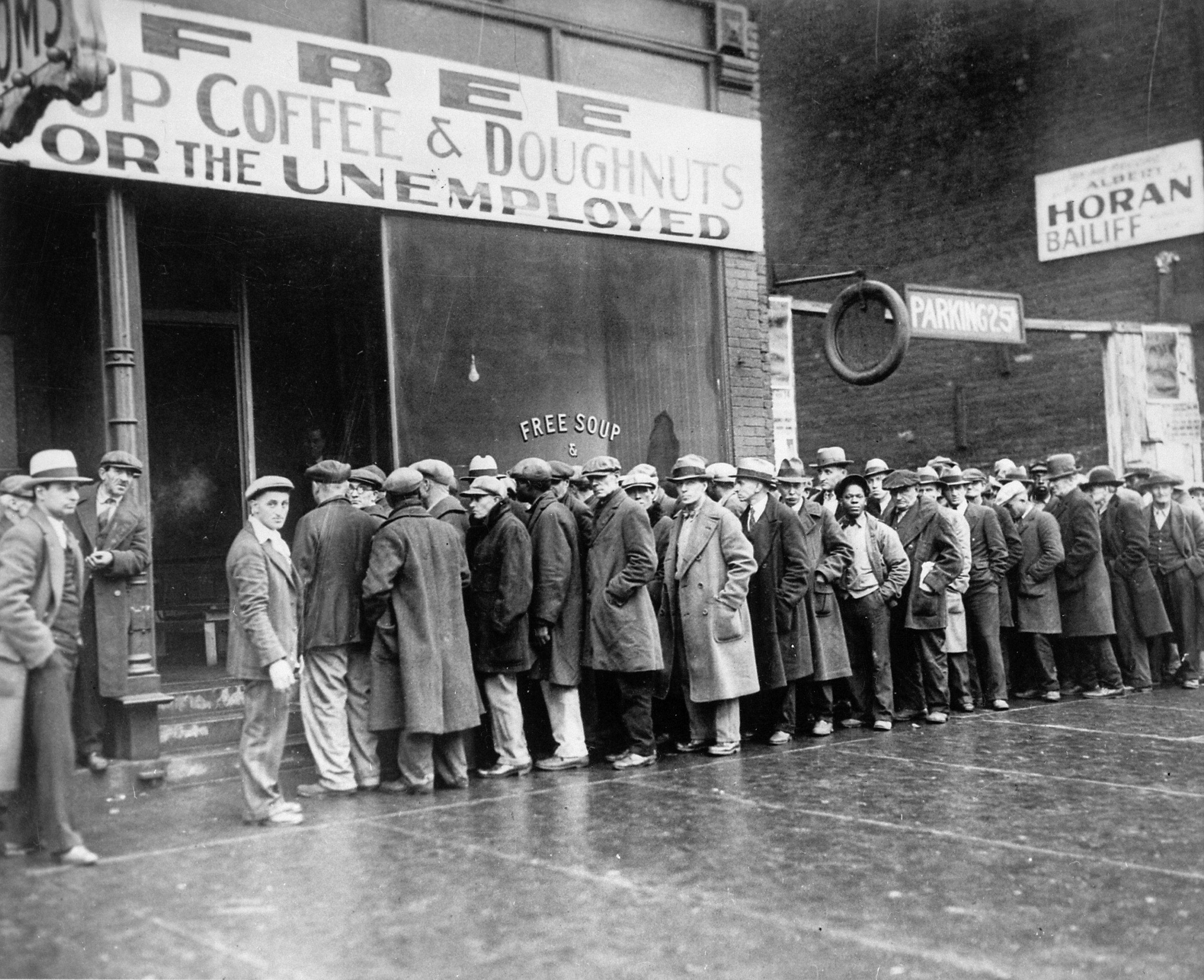
Unemployed men queue outside a depression soup kitchen in United States during the Great Depression.

In economics, an excess supply, economic surplus market surplus or briefly supply is a situation in which the quantity of a good or service supplied is more than the quantity demanded, and the price is above the equilibrium level determined by supply and demand. That is, the quantity of the product that producers wish to sell exceeds the quantity that potential buyers are willing to buy at the prevailing price. It is the opposite of an economic shortage (excess demand).

== Disequilibrium ==
A disequilibrium occurs due to a non-equilibrium price giving a lack of balance between supply and demand. Excess supply is one of the two types of disequilibrium in a perfectly competitive market, excess demand being the other. When quantity supplied is greater than quantity demanded, the equilibrium level does not obtain and instead the market is in disequilibrium. An excess supply prevents the economy from operating efficiently.

== Market response to excess supply ==
Excess supply in a market is the "extra" amount of supply, beyond the quantity demanded. As an example, assume that the price of a television is $600, the quantity supplied at that price is 1000 televisions, and that the quantity demanded is 300 televisions. This illustrates that sellers are seeking to sell 700 more televisions than buyers are willing to purchase. Hence, an excess supply of 700 televisions exists, indicating that the market is in a state of disequilibrium. In this situation, producers would not be able to sell all the televisions they produce at the desired price of $600. This will induce them to reduce their price in order to make the product more attractive for the buyers. In response to the reduction in the price of the product, consumers will increase their quantity demanded and producers will not produce as many as before. The market will eventually become balanced as the market is transitioning to an equilibrium price and quantity.

== Market spillovers ==
Excess supply in one market can affect supply or demand in another market. For example, when there is excess supply in the labor market—that is, unemployment—consumer-laborers will be constrained in their disposable income and hence will demand a smaller quantity of goods at any given price. This diminished goods demand resulting from a constraint in another market is known as the effective demand for goods.

== Causes ==
The most probable cause of excess supply is that the suppliers cannot perfectly predict the market (unpredictable events, which leads to changes of supply or demand). Even perfect screening of market is not possible.

Another situation which lead to excess supply is nominal rigidity, which is when suppliers are not able to quickly adapt to new situations. Suppliers have large stocks of goods and they cannot sell it with old price all. They cannot usually immediately change volume of production, especially if production process is really long.

Here are some examples of why demand may decline and thus excess supply is created:

- financial, economic crisis – people are scared and thus they spend less money and it automatically deepens the crisis
- deflation – people think that they will be able to buy more for the same money in the future (deferred consumption) and thus it causes probably short term excess supply
- products are forgotten quickly or they quickly become unpopular so the demand drop in the months or weeks
- price control (price floor) – when the government interrupts market forces by imposing a price minimum above the equilibrium, excess supply is created

Here are some examples of why supply may raise and thus excess supply emerge:

- weather – for example excellent weather results in excellent harvests or sunny and windy days can lead to excess supply in electricity (typical for smaller regions in Australia)
- cheap labor or free (autonomous) production
- excessive production support (for example from government)
- new technologies, which can be a product with old one's machine. We can see this problem in the world of mobile phones and many other devices, Lot of parts of this device is made up on the same production line with just setting machines on different settings. Those devices are sold at high prices because it is hot new so the demand on it is not so high on the other hand producer can make a lot of them.
- Instant increase of production (usually hold for small monopoly markets with one manufacturer which upgrade his production line)
- price wars
- New entrants to the market with access to cheaper labor, energy, capital or land

== Symptoms ==
According to Steven Ricchiuto if the economy is stuck in a rut of excess supply, then slow growth and deflation will persist. Furthermore, the higher prices will have a negative effect on consumers, while producers will be left with excess inventories until the market corrects itself entirely.

== Consequences ==
One of the possible consequences is that producers need to lower their prices, which may lead to that they lower wages or they fire some employee. On a global scale if there is excess of supply (globally) then most people get less money and they can buy even less, so the excess of supply gets even worse, luckily as goes time producers will lower their production to get the market to equilibrium. If the production can not be reduce as quickly it can lead to economic crises, which will be more dangers for global economy.

Agricultural producers are the ones that have to deal with excess supply most of the time. A good harvest will most likely result in excess supply, thus, when weather conditions are optimal a situation of excess supply arises. Therefore, agricultural producers are left with excess inventories that are quickly perishable. In this case we cannot expect that the market will correct itself; these goods are perishable and the market needs time to correct itself, furthermore, the competition between producers won't be enough to reduce the price until it gets to the equilibrium as there is not enough time. In this situation the government can choose to step in, and help agricultural producers by buying the excess inventories. However, this gives rise to another problem, and that is the fact that the government has to spend a part of its budget that could have been used for any other purpose that could have given more benefits to the economy. The consequences is that the government has to increase its spending on something that will only benefit agricultural producers.

== Examples ==
During the COVID-19 pandemic, many examples of excess supply were seen. Firstly, the limited mobility of people across borders, due to pandemic measures, contributed to labour shortages; especially in the agricultural sector. The shift of demand and the disruption of supply chains led to excess supply seen in industries that could not adapt to the new norm caused by the global pandemic.

The 2020 Russia–Saudi Arabia oil price war is a perfect example of excess oil supplied by these two countries. After failing to reach an agreement the OPEC+ alliance was disbanded, and shortly after Russia increased its production of oil, Saudi Arabia followed and a price war emerged. This combined with the lower demand for oil, caused by the pandemic, led to excess supply with prices even going negative on the 20th of April. Even after Russia and Saudi Arabia reached an agreement to cut oil production, excess supply was still present.

== Prevention of excess supply ==
One way how to prevent excess supply is to find an optimal production plan for the specific products for example based on historical data. As in the above example with ice cream sell note X_{t} the count of scoops that ice creamer sold in the t-th week of the year. For future times is X_{t} random process. We can figure out the probability distribution of X_{t} based on historical data. If in previous years were sold 53,56,55,57 scoops in week 27 it's not really probably that in 27th week this year will sell over 100 scoops. One of the ways how to estimate how much ice cream prepare for next week is to do the mean of historical values. Another approach is to extrapolate the data 53,56,55,57 for example using some regression. One way is surely to maximize expected profit. In this case, one also need to estimate the probability distribution of the count of scoops that will be sold next week.

In the case of demand, encouraging customers to buy things, for example, sales are an effective instrument that allows sellers to reduce inventory as well as other marketing techniques such as 2+1, black Fridays and night shopping.

Generally, if we look at theorems in paragraph causes and we improve them or reverse them it helps to avoid excess supply, so financial and economic stability contributes to stable demand so as inflation (money yesterday have less value so it's better to spend them today).

Finally if it is possible to make production more flexible,

According to Steven Ricchiuto, individual states solve excess supply with devaluing their currency in hopes that they can push the problem of excess capacity onto the country with the strongest currency.

These methods can also be used by countries to prevent excess supply:

- Establish market transparency with reliable information – this can help increase the co-operation between countries to find solutions to supply-sided problems, in order to avoid a situation similar to the 2008 food price crisis.
- Keep markets open – an open international trading system will bring more economic success to countries as supply chains won't be disrupted, thus, goods will be able to arrive to where they are needed.
- Limit trade restrictions – by doing this countries can ensure that supply is not undermined.

== See also ==
- Aggregate demand
- Aggregate supply
- Aggregation problem
- Disequilibrium
- Economic surplus
- Effective demand
- Excess demand
- Excess demand function
- Induced demand
- Keynesian formula
- Reproduction (economics)
- Scarcity
- Supply and demand
- Supply shock
