= Principles of Political Economy (Malthus book) =

1820 book by Thomas Malthus

Principles of Political Economy Considered with a View to their Applications
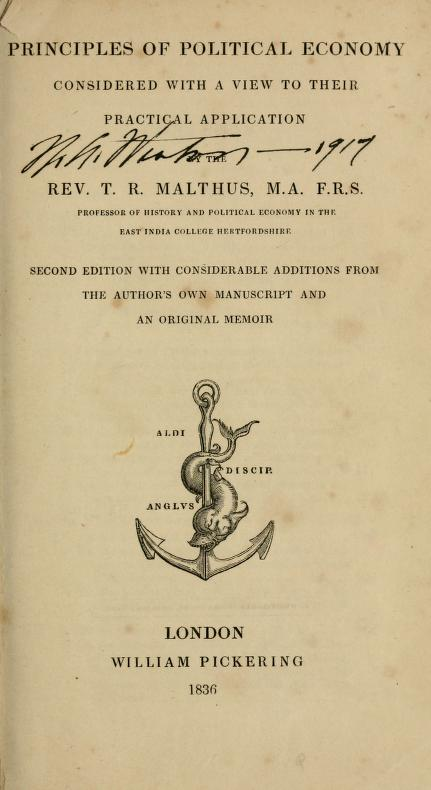
- Cover page (second edition)
- Author: Thomas Robert Malthus
- Language: English
- Publication date: 1820
- Publication place: England

Principles of Political Economy Considered with a View to their Applications, simply referred to as Principles of Political Economy, was written by the British political economist Thomas Robert Malthus in 1820. Malthus wrote Principles of Political Economy as a rebuttal to David Ricardo's On the Principles of Political Economy and Taxation. While the main focus of their work is to explain economic depressions in Europe and the reasons why they occur, Malthus uses his scholarship to explore price determination and the value of goods.

== Summary ==
In Principles of Political Economy, Malthus' rebuts David Ricardo's work, particularly rejecting idea developed by Jean Baptiste Say that theorizes that supply generates its own demand, known as Say's law. Say's law emphasizes the idea that there is no tendency towards a depression because as supply increases, people will naturally demand more. Say believes that an overflow of supply of certain goods will trigger a lack of supply of another type of good. This will create a new balance in the economy. Malthus claims that supply does not generate its own demand and that oversupply can lead the economy to recession. Malthus understands production and demand to exist independent of each other. Both are determined by their own factors. From this Malthus generates the idea of "effective demand," which later becomes popular in Keynesian economics. "Effective demand" iterates that consumers purchase more or less of a good depending on the price a firm charges for it. Malthus' idea suggests that the amount of goods supplied may be a result of the demand.

Furthermore, Malthus argues that the economy tends to move towards recessions because productivity often grows more quickly than demand. Malthus suggests increasing government spending and private investment on luxuries to cure recessions. This idea firmly goes against the notion that Ricardo and Say hold that the economy will fix itself through demand.

== Second edition ==
A second edition of Malthus' Principles of Political Economy was published in 1836. After the first version's publication, Adam Smith develops the idea that an object's inherent value is related to the labor that went into its creation. Additionally, Smith creates the notion that a good's price also moves in the direction of the price of other commodities. After careful contemplation, Malthus adopts Smith's theory of value. This new thought process goes against his previous belief that there is no accurate way to measure an object's value.

Although this new conclusion would only call for revision of the sixth and seventh sections of his second chapter, Malthus uses this new revelation as an excuse to re-examine his whole book. For the most part, his additions simply clarify sections and omit ideas more clear in other sections. He does not alter any of his main ideas in his book. Malthus died before he was able to publish the new edition, but it is believed he made all his intended alterations. His work was later collected and published in 1836.

== Responses and critiques ==
Malthus' book received mixed feedback from other economists of the time. Twentieth century British economist John Maynard Keynes is considered an admirer of Malthus' work. In fact, he is even quoted in saying, “If only Malthus, instead of Ricardo, had been the parent stem from which nineteenth-century economics proceeded, what a much wiser and richer place the world would be today!” Many of Keynes' ideas that became the basis of Keynesian economics are influenced by Principles of Political Economy. Although Malthus fails to connect long-run supply and demand curve as setting the natural price of an item, Malthus is one of the first to describe the natural price of an item. Keynes utilizes this idea and also draws on Malthus' concept of government spending during times of economic crisis. Keynes cites this chapter of Malthus' book as "a masterly exposition of the conditions which determine the optimum of saving in the actual economic system in which we live." However, Keynes also critiques Thomas Malthus. He faults Malthus' work for being "unable to explain clearly (apart from an appeal to the facts of common observation) how and why effective demand could be deficient or excessive."

John Stuart Mill, a nineteenth-century British economist, also criticized Malthus's book in his book, which was also titled Principles of Political Economy. He called Malthus' work "a more mischievous doctrine," and mocked for believing that government intervention is an appropriate solution to recessions. Mill took the approach that the government is too corrupt and that a moral individual would not accept its help. Furthermore, he emphasized that Say's law is accurate and justified in economic studies.

William Blake, another economist of the time, takes the opposite opinion of Mill. Blake applauds Malthus' idea of government expenditure in order to stimulate the economy. Without Malthus' suggested government intervention, Blake believes the economy would remain stuck in a depression.

== Impact ==
Malthus' work did not spark many economic debates at the time of its publication. In fact, many denied Malthus' ideas on recessions. Say's law remained the more commonly accepted theory at the time due to its popularity. Malthus' book does not attract much attention until the Great Depression occurs and it becomes evident that depressions are real. After this, economists such as John Maynard Keynes begin to look more deeply into Malthus' ideas and utilize them in their own work.
