= Aggregate behavior =

In economics, aggregate behavior refers to economy-wide sums of individual behavior. It involves relationships between economic aggregates such as national income, government expenditure, and aggregate demand. For example, the consumption function is a relationship between aggregate demand for consumption and aggregate disposable income.

Models of aggregate behavior may be derived from direct observation of the economy, or from models of individual behavior. Theories of aggregate behavior are central to macroeconomics.

== Overview ==
Aggregate behavior is the study of interactions of factors which affect individual households or firms which in turn affect their economic behavior, subsequently resulting in the alterations of the economy. As aggregate behavior is defined differently according to different schools of economical theories, households and firms react differently to fluctuations in the economy. The interactions between factors macroeconomics and microeconomics will result various changes, be it positive or negative.

== Relationship between macroeconomics and microeconomics and how it affects aggregate behavior ==
The key factors of macroeconomics are gross domestic product, interest rates, employment indicators, fiscal policy and monetary policy.

The key factors of microeconomics are supply and demand in individual markets, individual's choices, market externalities, and the labor market.

The interaction between these key microeconomic and macroeconomic factors will determine how each individual reacts to the market. For example, if an individual runs a shop in his local community whilst the economy of his country is in recession, that individual may not deem his market as being affected by the weak economy and may in fact view his business as booming and thus spend more in expanding his business.

However, not all individuals will have the same stance. Some may save their money due to the weak economy. This leads to the Rational choice theory which theories that individual behaviors are skewered to each's desire to benefit the most from it.

The economy's strength is measured based on each's gross domestic product. The demand for gross domestic product is measured by the aggregate demand function which is:

AD = C + I + G + (X-M)

Aggregate demand is the sum of all individual demands in the market. Having said that, aggregate behavior may or may not result in changes of the aggregate demand due to the different thoughts of economics.

== Conflicts of aggregate behavior ==
In different schools of thought of economics, aggregate behavior may play a part in the entire process in determining the aggregate demand of the economy and in others it may not. In the neoclassical theory of economics, individual consumer behavior will not have any effect on the aggregate demand. This is due to the fact that even though consumers have different tastes and incomes, consumers will still purchase the goods and services to their own interest, thus ensuring that the resources are continuously flowing in the market. In the Keynesian theory of economics, it is argued that both public and individual behavior will have an effect on aggregate demand due to expenditure.

== Aim of aggregate behavior ==
The aim of aggregate behavior is to consolidate individual's economical behavior into a simple logical variable, so as allow an economical analyst to analyse the data. Furthermore, the consumption function arguments allow the assumption that all individual consumers are similar in their economical behavior, thus allowing the economical analyst to create a macroeconomic model.

The individual demand behavior can be said to be nonlinear, hence it is impossible to create an economic model. Thus, examining the appropriate aggregation factors will ensure more reasonable interpretation of the aggregate demand curve. Furthermore, as consumption is a key factor in aggregate demand and is heteoroagenic in nature, the aggregate economy model's will vary. Henceforth, consolidating individuals behavior will limit the complications that may arise, allowing the formatting of a more accurate model.

Furthermore, in modern analysis of fiscal policies, more attention is given to dynamic considerations. Hence, by deriving the private sector's aggregate behavior from the utility maximising behavior of individuals, it allows a meaningful treatment of normative issues which allows macroeconomic analysis to be applicable to economic issues.

== Psychology of aggregate behavior ==
Psychology plays a part in the neoclassical economics because aggregate behavior always falls back to individual behavior. In market equilibrium of no net profits, individuals are constrained maximisers of their objective functions. Psychology would therefore attempt to explain short-run, disequilibrium behavior in a manner which would be consistent with the no net profit market equilibrium.

Keynes' theory that individuals behave under conditions of fundamental uncertainty and that decentralised markets always produce full employment and efficient use of resources has been broadly consistent with individual behavior in real world conditions. This thus deems Keynes' characterisation of capitalist economies being prone to financial instability, unemployment, irrational waste of resource and others. This is one such speculation if one can aggregate an individual's behavior to the aggregate level.

§ Listed in The New Palgrave Dictionary of Economics as Aggregation (Econometrics).

== See also ==
- Aggregation problem
- Aggregate Demand
