= Shortage =

Economic demand that exceeds supply

Supply and demand, with market-clearing price shown

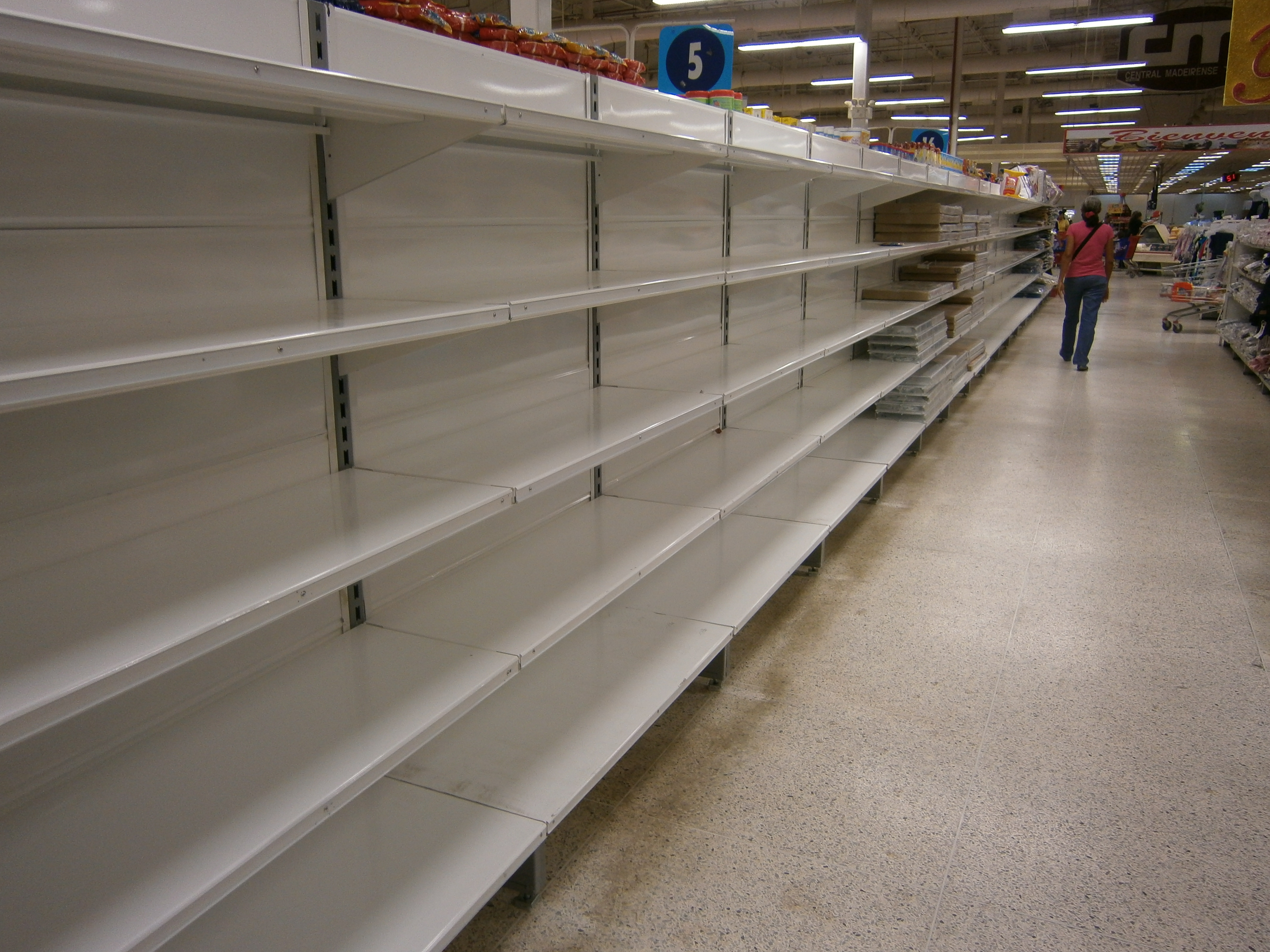
A 2014 image of product shortages in Venezuela

In economics, a shortage or excess demand is a situation in which the demand for a product or service exceeds its supply in a market. It is the opposite of an excess supply (surplus).

== Definitions ==
In a perfect market (one that matches a simple microeconomic model), an excess of demand will prompt sellers to increase prices until demand at that price matches the available supply, establishing market equilibrium. In economic terminology, a shortage occurs when for some reason (such as government intervention, or decisions by sellers not to raise prices) the price does not rise to reach equilibrium. In this circumstance, buyers want to purchase more at the market price than the quantity of the good or service that is available, and some non-price mechanism (such as "first come, first served" or a lottery) determines which buyers are served.

In common use, the term "shortage" may refer to a situation where most people are unable to find a desired good at an affordable price, especially where supply problems have increased the price. "Market clearing" happens when all buyers and sellers willing to transact at the prevailing price are able to find partners. There are almost always willing buyers at a lower-than-market-clearing price; the narrower technical definition does not consider failure to serve this demand as a "shortage", even if it would be described that way in a social or political context (which the simple model of supply and demand does not attempt to encompass).

== Causes ==
Shortages (in the technical sense) may be caused by the following causes:

- Price ceilings, a type of price control which involves a government-imposed limit on the price of a product or service.
- Anti-price gouging laws.
- Government ban on the sale of a product or service, such as prostitution or certain recreational drugs.
- Branding efforts, i.e. a supplier selling a product below the market-clearing price, in order to cause a visible shortage so as to plant an impression of desirability in the minds of consumers. This is typically employed in the marketing of high status goods and services.
- Decisions by suppliers not to raise prices in order to maintain friendly relationships with potential future customers during a supply disruption.
- Artificial scarcity.

== Effects ==
Decisions which result in a below-market-clearing price help some people and hurt others. In this case, shortages may be accepted because they theoretically enable a certain portion of the population to purchase a product that they could not afford at the market-clearing price. The cost is to those who are willing to pay for a product and either cannot, or experience greater difficulty in doing so.

In the case of government intervention in the market, there is always a trade-off with positive and negative effects. For example, a price ceiling may cause a shortage, but it will also enable a certain percentage of the population to purchase a product that they could not afford at market costs. Economic shortages caused by higher transaction costs and opportunity costs (e.g., in the form of lost time) also mean that the distribution process is wasteful. Both of these factors contribute to a decrease in aggregate wealth.

Shortages may or will cause:

- Black (illegal) and grey (unregulated) markets in which products that are unavailable in conventional markets are sold, or in which products with excess demand are sold at higher prices than in the conventional market.
- Artificial controls of demand, such as time (such as waiting in line at queues) and rationing.
- Non-monetary bargaining methods, such as time (for example queuing), nepotism, or even violence.
- Panic buying
- Price discrimination.
- The inability to purchase a product, and subsequent forced saving.
- Increase in demand for substitute goods.
- Deadweight loss due to artificial scarcity; a net loss of economic welfare to society occurs when an artificial limit of supply (by monopolies or oligopolies to maximise profits), limits the number of people who can enjoy the good.

Shortages can lead to businesses restructuring their supply chains, developing supply relationships with more local or otherwise influenceable suppliers, and paying more attention to supply management and professional procurement expertise in their business planning.

== Examples ==
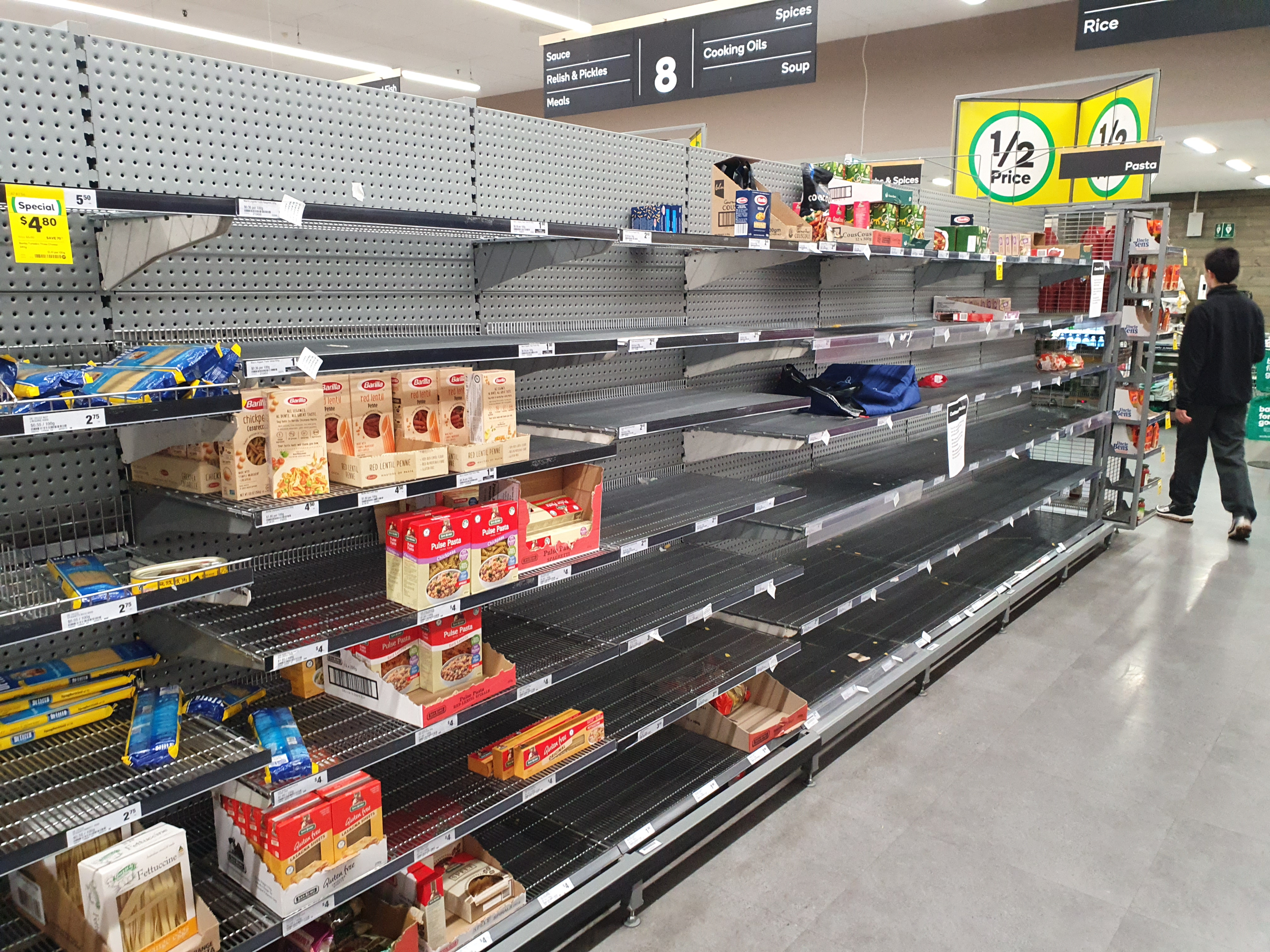
Empty supermarket shelves in the dry pasta section due to panic-buying as the result of the 2020 COVID-19 outbreak

Many regions around the world have experienced shortages in the past:

- Food shortages have occurred in the United States during the Great Depression.
- Rationing in the United Kingdom and the United States occurred mainly during and after the world wars.
- Potato shortages in the Netherlands triggered the 1917 Potato riots.
- From 1920 to 1933 during prohibition in the United States, a black market for liquor was created due to the low supply of alcoholic beverages.
- During the 1973 oil crisis, rationing and price controls were instituted in many countries, which caused shortages.
- In the former Soviet Union during the 1980s, prices were artificially low by fiat (i.e., high prices were outlawed). Soviet citizens waited in line for various price-controlled goods and services such as cars, apartments, or some types of clothing. From the point of view of those waiting in line, such goods were in perpetual "short supply"; some of them were willing and able to pay more than the official price ceiling, but were legally prohibited from doing so. This method for determining the allocation of goods in short supply is known as "rationing".
- From the mid-2000s through the 2010s, shortages in Venezuela occurred, due to the Venezuelan government's economic policies, such as relying on foreign imports while creating strict foreign exchange controls, put price controls in place and having expropriations result with lower domestic production. As a result of such shortages, Venezuelans had to search for products, wait in lines for hours and rationing was initiated, with the government allowing the purchase of a certain amount of products when it's available, through fingerprint recognition.
- Shortages in Sudan sparked a revolution in 2019 which ended President Omar al-Bashir's 30-year rule. They continued into 2020.
- Panic buying due to the COVID-19 pandemic caused food and product shortages around the world.

== Shortages in relation to employment ==
=== Labour shortages ===
In a narrow economic definition, a labour shortage is an imbalance between the supply of and demand for workers, or workers with specific skills, at given wages. According to the Frisch elasticity of labor supply, lower wages reduce labour supply.

In a wider definition, a widespread and persistent domestic labour shortage is caused by excessively low salaries (relative to the domestic cost of living) and adverse working conditions (excessive workload and working hours) in low-wage industries (hospitality and leisure, education, health care, rail transportation, aviation, retail, manufacturing, food, elderly care), which collectively lead to occupational burnout and attrition of existing workers, reduced incentives to attract domestic workers, short-staffing at workplaces and further exacerbation (positive feedback) of staff shortages.

Labour shortages can occur even during periods with unemployment within specific industries or high youth unemployment due to low salaries offered. Some business associations such as chambers of commerce, trade associations or employers' organizations lobby for an increased immigration of foreign workers who will work for less pay or in worse labour conditions according to the global labor arbitrage. In addition, business associations have campaigned for greater state provision of child care, which would enable more women to re-enter the labour workforce at a lower wage rate to achieve economic equilibrium. However, lower salaries discourage local labour from entering the relevant industries and can cause labour shortages in developing countries.

The Atlantic slave trade (which originated in the early 17th century but ended by the early 19th century) was said to have originated from perceived shortages of agricultural labour in the Americas (particularly in the Southern United States). It was thought that bringing African labor was the only means of malaria resistance available at the time.

=== Job shortages ===
Measures of job shortages include the unemployment rate and underemployment rate.. However, economists usually refer and think of such a condition as a surplus of labor.

== See also ==
- Aggregation problem
- Allocative efficiency
- Dependency ratio
- Eastern Bloc economies
- Disequilibrium
- Economic surplus
- Effective demand
- Excess demand function
- Excess supply
- Keynesian formula
- Permanent Labor Certification
- Productivity-improving technologies
- Reproduction
- Scarcity
- Shortage economy
- Supply shock
