= William Blake (economist) =

English classical economist (1774–1852)

William Blake (31 January 1774 – 1852) was an English classical economist who contributed to the early theory of purchasing power parity.

== Life ==
He was born in London on 31 January 1774, the son of William and Alicia Blake. He was educated at Charterhouse School, and entered Trinity College, Cambridge in 1789. He graduated B.A. in 1793 as 7th wrangler, became a Fellow of the college in 1795, and graduated M.A. in 1796. Giving up his fellowship in 1797, he entered Lincoln's Inn, and was called to the bar in 1799. Blake was elected a Fellow of the Royal Society in 1807. He served as President of the Geological Society of London in 1815–6, which he had joined in 1812. He became a member of the Royal Geographical Society in 1830. He also belonged to the Political Economy Club, from 1831, and the King of Clubs dining club of Whigs.

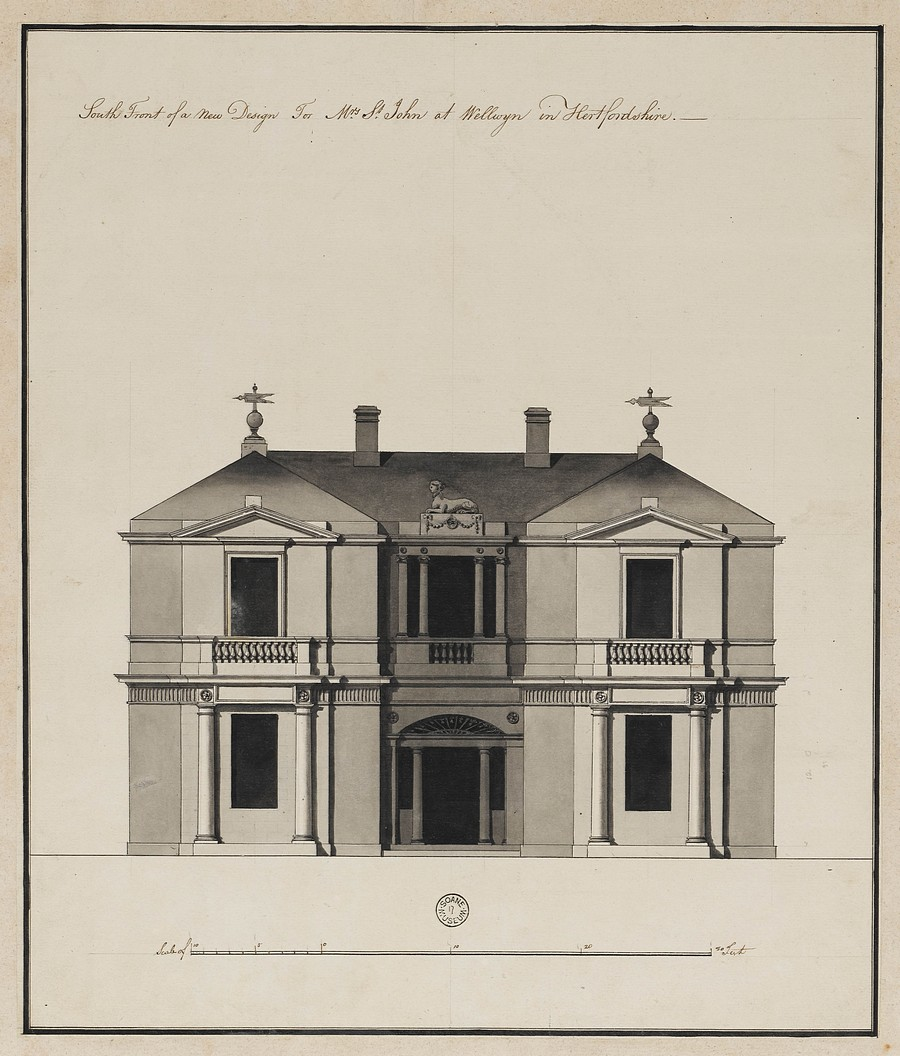
St John's Lodge, original architectural drawing by Robert Adam; the actual design was somewhat modified.

Blake leased St John's Lodge in Welwyn, Hertfordshire, with a park of 130 acres, from 1819. He purchased the property in 1824, changing the name to Danesbury. He was High Sheriff of Hertfordshire in 1836. As a result of the Slave Compensation Act 1837, Blake was given £34,301 in compensation from the British government as the trustee of the estate of John Robley, his brother-in-law; Robley's estate included slaves in Tobago and Saint Kitts.

== Views ==
Blake was initially known as a bullionist, one of the monetary writers of the early 19th century. He published Observations on the Principles Which Regulate the Course of Exchange, and on the Present Depreciated Slate of the Currency (1810). For half a century it was considered a leading authority on exchange rates. It made heavy reference to the writing of John Wheatley. Fossati has argued that the debates on money and bank credit for British parliamentary reports of 1804 and 1810 clarified the theory, at the hands of Wheatley and others, including in particular Blake and John Leslie Foster (with Walter Boyd, Lord King, and Henry Thornton). Joseph Lowe, who wrote many reviews of the pamphlet literature of the bullion debate, approved of Blake's content but complained he was verbose.

Blake's 1823 pamphlet on government expenditure, Observations on the Effects Produced by Government Expenditure during the Restriction of Cash Payments, caused a stir, however. It was a pioneer work of its period, and has been considered to have anticipated the transfer theory of Frank William Taussig. David Ricardo wrote a reply, and Blake a rejoinder. Ricardo wrote notes on Blake that remained unpublished until 1951. Matters of definition still plagued discussion: Ricardo's idea of depreciation clouded, in Blake's view, the issues. In common with many contemporaries, Blake used balance of trade inconsistently or unclearly as a term.

Mark Blaug's view was that Blake had shown up "blind spots" in Ricardo's theory. Ricardo wrote to his correspondent Hutches Trower that John Ramsay McCulloch hadn't managed to talk Blake out of his "newly published opinions"; in fact, as he told McCulloch, Ricardo had seen the paper before publication, and concluded that Blake agreed more with him than he was aware of. John Stuart Mill in reviewing the work denied the ability of governments to stimulate economic activity. Mill defended Say's law, while Blake was more in sympathy with the views of Robert Malthus on the economic depression of the early 1820s (though he added a disclaimer on not arguing in terms of public policy). Mill in defending Ricardo interpreted the orthodox doctrine on the export of gold in a way that conceded its part in bilateral trade. He in fact used some of Blake's ideas in his later work Essays on Some Unsettled Questions of Political Economy (1844), without attribution.

McCulloch later reprinted Blake's 1810 pamphlet, praising it in his introduction of 1857.

== Family ==
Blake married Mary Nash 25 July 1797 (bringing an end to his fellowship) and the estates of John Darker were settled on the couple. The death in 1822 of Edward Loveden Loveden of Buscot Park, who had married Mary's sister Anne, brought them an inheritance. They had three sons and five daughters. The sons were:

- William John Blake, politician;
- Frederic Rodolph Blake C.B, army officer;
- Henry Woolaston Blake, partner in Boulton & Watt.

The daughters were:

- Mary, who married Wilhelm, Baron (Freiherr) de Biel and resided at Zierow;
- Ellen, who married John Alexander Hankey;
- Caroline, who married Henry Davidson;
- Emily, who married Christopher William Puller; and
- Frances (Fanny), unmarried; the fourth daughter, according to a memorial inscription.
