= Essays on Some Unsettled Questions of Political Economy =

1844 treatise by John Stuart Mill

- Author: John Stuart Mill
- Language: English
- Publisher: J.W. Parker
- Publication date: 1844
- OCLC: 29921338
- LC Class: HB161 .M645

Essays on Some Unsettled Questions of Political Economy (1844) is a treatise on political economics by John Stuart Mill. Walras' law, a principle in general equilibrium theory named in honour of Léon Walras, was first expressed by Mill in this treatise. Karl Marx remarked of the work, “The few original ideas of Mill Junior are contained in this narrow little volume, not in his fat, pedantic magnum opus.” The significance of this contribution of Mill has been analyzed by Manicas (1987) in his History & Philosophy of the Social Sciences as follows:

When Adam Smith published his work on The Wealth of Nations, 'political economy' referred to 'the art or practical science of managing the resources of nations, so as to increase its material wealth'. Smith conceived his project holistically and as substantially practical, not analytical. Successors of Smith accepted the broad outlines of his definition, but were concerned with transforming this historical and qualitative effort into a “science”. But where would the “laws” of this science come from? Mill provided a critical step towards the modern conception of the science of economics. He settled this “unsettled” question in his definition of economics as "The science which treats of the production and distribution of wealth, so far as they depend upon the laws of human nature." The "science" would come from the 'laws of human nature' which 'appertain to man as a mere individual'. They 'form a part of the subject of pure mental philosophy'. There are other 'principles of human nature which are peculiarly connected with the ideas and feelings generated in man by living in a state of society'. These laws 'form the subject of a branch of science which may be aptly designated from the title of social economy, somewhat less happily by that of speculative politics, or the science of politics ...'. Mill settled the "unsettled" questions by clarifying that political economy proceeded from principles of human nature, that it was abstract and deductive, and significantly, that it had an autonomous subject-matter – the laws of 'the economy'.

== See also ==
- Principles of Political Economy
