= Principles of Political Economy =

1848 book by John Stuart Mill

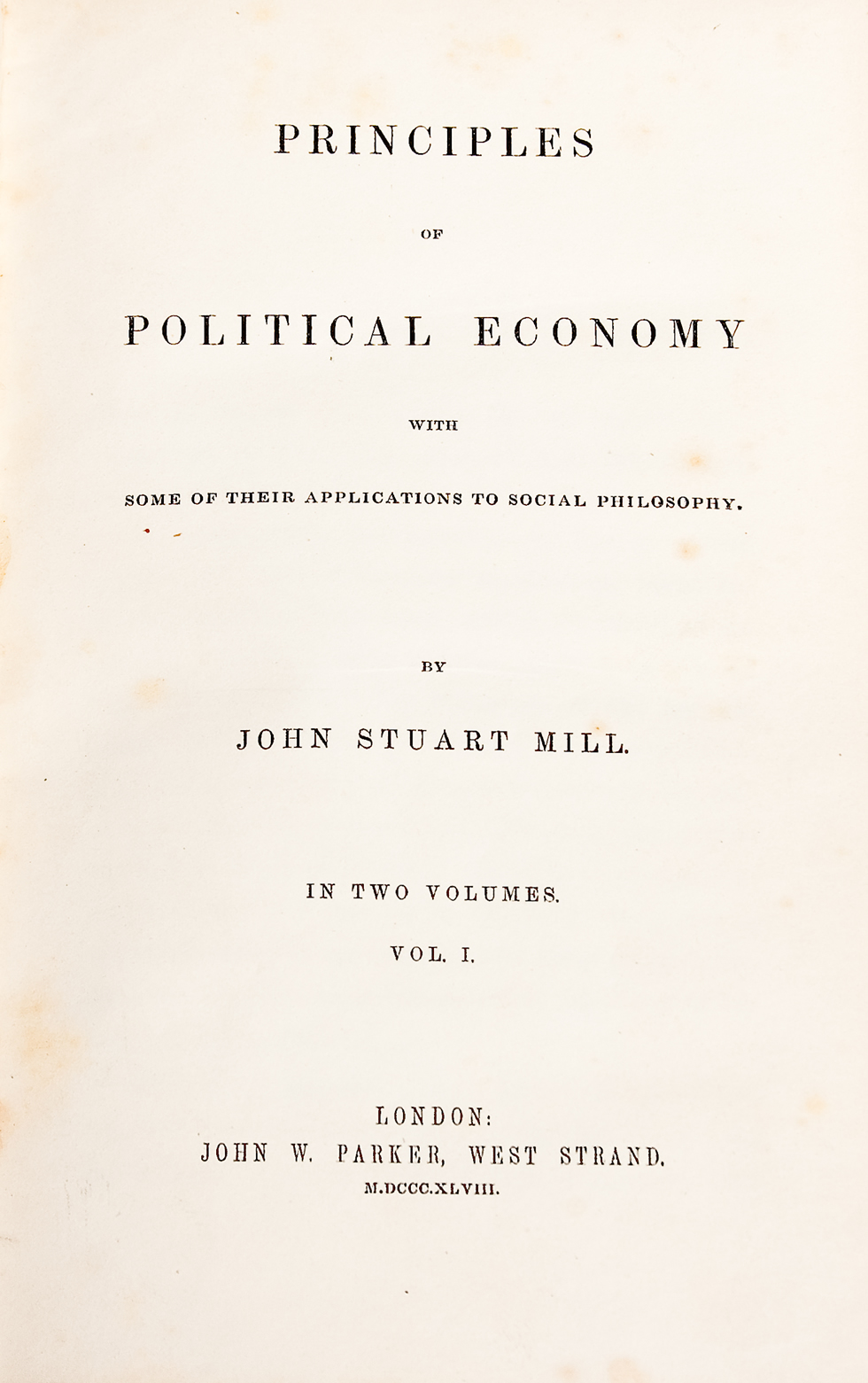
- Cover first edition, 1848
- Author: John Stuart Mill
- Language: English
- Subject: Political philosophy
- Genre: Nonfiction
- Publisher: John W. Parker
- Publication date: 1848
- Publication place: United Kingdom
- Media type: Print
- Pages: 450
- Text: Principles of Political Economy at Wikisource

Principles of Political Economy (1848) by John Stuart Mill was one of the most important economics or political economy textbooks of the mid-nineteenth century. It was revised until its seventh edition in 1871, shortly before Mill's death in 1873, and republished in numerous other editions. Beside discussing descriptive issues such as which nations tended to benefit more in a system of trade based on comparative advantage (Mill's answer: those with more elastic demands for other countries' goods), the work also discussed normative issues such as ideal systems of political economy, critiquing proposed systems such as communism and socialism. Along with A System of Logic, Principles of Political Economy established Mill's reputation as a leading public intellectual. Mill's sympathetic attitude in this work and in other essays toward contemporary socialism, particularly Fourierism, earned him esteem from some of the working class as one of their intellectual champions.

== Preface and Preliminary Remarks ==
Mill's Principles were written in a style of prose far flung from the introductory texts of today. Devoid of the mathematical graphs and formulae that were only developed after his death, principally by Alfred Marshall, Mill wrote with the rich tone of grandeur that is found in all his books. His book continued to be used well into the twentieth century as the foundational textbook, for instance in Oxford University until 1919.

- Preliminary remarks

== Book I Production ==
I Of the Requisites of Production

Mill explores the nature of production, beginning with labour and its relationship to nature. He starts by stating, that the "requisites of production are two: labour, and appropriate natural objects." A discussion follows of man's connection to the natural world, and how man must labour to utilise almost anything found in the natural world. He uses a rich array of imagery, from the sewing of cloth, to the turning of wheels and the creation of steam. Man has found a way to harness nature, so that "the muscular action necessary for this is not constantly renewed, but performed once for all, and there is on the whole a great economy of labour." He then turns on the view of who "takes the credit" for industry. "Some writers," he says,

"have raised the question, whether nature gives more assistance to labour in one kind of industry or in another; and have said that in some occupations labour does most, in others nature most. In this, however, there seems much confusion of ideas. The part which nature has in any work of man, is indefinite and incommensurable. It is impossible to decide that in any one thing nature does more than in any other. One cannot even say that labour does less. Less labour may be required; but if that which is required is absolutely indispensable, the result is just as much the product of labour, as of nature. When two conditions are equally necessary for producing the effect at all, it is unmeaning to say that so much of it is produced by one and so much by the other; it is like attempting to decide which half of a pair of scissors has most to do in the act of cutting; or which of the factors, five and six, contributes most to the production of thirty."

He refers to former French Economists and Adam Smith, who thought land rents were higher because there was more nature being provided. In fact, says Mill, the simple answer is that land is scarce, which is what enables greater rent exaction. He mentions that many things are limited in abundance, for instance, Arctic whale fishing, which could not keep supplied the demand. This alludes to an introductory principle of value, that "as soon as there is not so much of the thing to be had, as would be appropriated and used if it could be obtained for asking; the ownership or use of the natural agent acquires an exchangeable value."

II Of Labour as an Agent of Production

III Of Unproductive Labour

IV Of Capital

Capital, says Mill, is "the accumulated stock of the produce of labour". Though its nature is misunderstood. He gives an example of the consumption of food, as opposed to assets allocated for production.

"The distinction, then, between Capital and Not-capital, does not lie in the kind of commodities, but in the mind of the capitalist – in his will to employ them for one purpose rather than another; and all property, however ill adapted in itself for the use of labourers, is a part of capital, so soon as it, or the value to be received from it, is set apart for productive reinvestment."

Capital, like labour, can be unemployed, and Mill gives an example of inefficient taxation of productive capital. Then he observes the surplus to living standards created by industrialism.

"Finally, that large portion of the productive capital of a country which is employed in paying the wages and salaries of labourers, evidently is not, all of it, strictly and indispensably necessary for production. As much of it as exceeds the actual necessaries of life and health (an excess which in the case of skilled labourers is usually considerable) is not expended in supporting labour, but in remunerating it, and the labourers could wait for this part of their remuneration until the production is completed; it needs not necessarily pre-exist as capital: and if they unfortunately had to forego it altogether, the same amount of production might take place. In order that the whole remuneration of the labourers should be advanced to them in daily or weekly payments, there must exist in advance, and be appropriated to productive use, a greater stock, or capital, than would suffice to carry on the existing extent of production: greater, by whatever amount of remuneration the labourers receive, beyond what the self-interest of a prudent slave-master would assign to his slaves. In truth, it is only after an abundant capital had already been accumulated, that the practice of paying in advance any remuneration of labour beyond a bare subsistence, could possibly have arisen: since whatever is so paid, is not really applied to production, but to the unproductive consumption of productive labourers, indicating a fund for production sufficiently ample to admit of habitually diverting a part of it to a mere convenience."

V Fundamental Propositions respecting Capital
VI Of Circulating and Fixed Capital
VII On what depends the degree of Productiveness of Productive Agents
VIII Of Co-operation, or the Combination of Labour
IX Of Production on a Large, and Production on a Small Scale
X Of the Law of the Increase of Labour
XI Of the Law of the Increase of Capital
XII Of the Law of the Increase of Production from Land
XIII Consequences of the Foregoing Laws

== Book II Distribution ==
- I Of Property
- II The same subject continued
- III Of the Classes among whom the Produce is distributed
- IV Of Competition and Custom
- V Of Slavery
- VI Of Peasant Proprietors
- VII Continuation of the same subject
- VIII Of Metayers
- IX Of Cottiers
- X Means of abolishing Cottier Tenancy
- XI Of Wages
- XII Of Popular Remedies for Low Wages
- XIII The Remedies for Low Wages further considered
- XIV Of the Differences of Wages in different Employments
- XV Of Profits
- XVI Of Rent

== Book III Exchange ==
In his third book, Mill addressed one of the issues left unresolved by David Ricardo's theory of comparative advantage, namely to whom the gains of trade were distributed. Mill's answer was that international trade benefited most the country whose demand for goods is most elastic. It is also in this third book, primarily in Chapter I, that Mill considers communism and socialism as alternatives to capitalism.

- I Of Value
- II Of Demand and Supply, in their relation to Value
- III Of Cost of Production, in its relation to Value
- IV Ultimate Analysis of Cost of Production
- V Of Rent, in its relation to Value
- VI Summary of the Theory of Value
- VII Of Money
- VIII Of the Value of Money, as dependent on Demand and Supply
- IX Of the Value of Money, as dependent on Cost of Production
- X Of a Double Standard, and Subsidiary Coins
- XI Of Credit, as a Substitute for Money
- XII Influence of Credit on Prices
- XIII Of an Inconvertible Paper Currency
- XIV Of Excess of Supply
- XV Of a Measure of Value
- XVI Of some Peculiar Cases of Value
- XVII Of International Trade
- XVIII Of International Values
- XIX Of Money, considered as an Imported Commodity
- XX Of the Foreign Exchanges
- XXI Of the Distribution of the Precious Metals through the Commercial World
- XXII Influence of the Currency on the Exchanges and on Foreign Trade
- XXIII Of the Rate of Interest
- XXIV Of the Regulation of a Convertible Paper Currency
- XXV Of the Competition of Different Countries in the same Market
- XXVI Of Distribution, as affected by Exchange

== Book IV Influence of the Progress of Society on Production and Distribution ==
In his fourth book Mill set out a number of possible future outcomes, rather than predicting one in particular. The first followed the Malthusian line that population grew quicker than supplies, leading to falling wages and rising profits. The second, per Smith, said if capital accumulated faster than population grew then real wages would rise. Third, echoing David Ricardo, should capital accumulate and population increase at the same rate, yet technology stay stable, there would be no change in real wages because supply and demand for labour would be the same. However growing populations would require more land use, increasing food production costs and therefore decreasing profits. The fourth alternative was that technology advanced faster than population and capital stock increased. The result would be a prospering economy. Mill felt the third scenario most likely, and he assumed technology advanced would have to end at some point. But on the prospect of ever intensifying economic activity, Mill was more ambivalent.

"I confess I am not charmed with the ideal of life held out by those who think that the normal state of human beings is that of struggling to get on; that the trampling, crushing, elbowing, and treading on each other's heels, which form the existing type of social life, are the most desirable lot of human kind, or anything but the disagreeable symptoms of one of the phases of industrial progress.

- I General characteristics of a Progressive State of Wealth
- II Influence of the Progress of Industry and Population on Values and Prices
- III Influence of the Progress of Industry and Population on Rents, Profits, and Wages
- IV Of the Tendency of Profits to a Minimum
- V Consequences of the Tendency of Profits to a Minimum
- VI Of the Stationary State
- VII On the Probable Futurity of the Labouring Classes

== Book V on the Influence of Government ==
In his fifth book, Mill outlined the government’s role in upholding liberty within society through necessary tasks, those that are fundamental to the government’s existence, and optional tasks, those that would arguably benefit the public if implemented. The necessary tasks mentioned include the protection of citizens from invasion, the safety of domestic life, and regulations on private property and the resources it produces. He states that the government must be cautious when intervening in economic issues to avoid disrupting the natural demand for freedom between consumers and producers to trade, he mentions this again when referring to the long-run negative impact of protectionism. However, he also notes the potential benefits of government intervention, including the expansion and maintenance of markets through subsidized exploration and the construction of lighthouses. These are examples of public goods and externalities in modern economics. Mill states that while the market fails to solve certain societal issues, the government must uphold both progress and liberty in its intervention within the market. Like his other work, specifically On Liberty (1859), Mill claims that government activity is justified so long as it is beneficial to society and does not infringe upon any individual’s freedom, other than limits on conduct to prevent harm to others, or on conduct which would affect prejudicially the interests of others.

Mill discusses his ideal system of taxation, promoting a tweaked version of proportional taxation that at a lower limit gives exemption to those earning less than the limit. Book V touches on the outdated idea of “double taxation,” which has turned into a debate on the usefulness of the expenditure tax in contemporary tax reform debates.

- I Of the Functions of Government in General
- II On the General Principles of Taxation
- III Of Direct Taxes
- IV Of Taxes on Commodities
- V Of some other Taxes
- VI Comparison between Direct and Indirect Taxation
- VII Of a National Debt
- VIII Of the Ordinary Functions of Government, considered as to their Economical Effects
- IX The same subject continued
- X Of Interferences of Government grounded on Erroneous Theories
- XI Of the Grounds and Limits of the Laisser-faire or Non-Interference Principle

== Reception ==
In 1856, this book was included in the Index Librorum Prohibitorum, thus being banned by the Catholic Church.

== See also ==
- Essays on Some Unsettled Questions of Political Economy (1844) John Stuart Mill
- Critique of political economy
- Principles of Political Economy by Thomas Malthus (1820)
