= Strip steel =

Steel strip

Strip steel or cold rolled strip is a steel product that is produced from a hot rolled strip that has been pickled. The coil is then reduced by a single stand cold roll steel mill straight away or reversing mill or in a tandem mill consisting of several single stands in a series. The strip is reduced to approximately final thickness by cold-rolling directly, or with the inclusion of an annealing operation at some intermediate thickness to facilitate further cold reduction or to obtain mechanical properties desired in the finished product. High carbon strip steel requires additional annealing and cold reduction operations. The coil is then slit to the desired width through the process of roll slitting. Stainless steel strip is the extension product of strip steel, usually long and narrow stainless steel strips are manufactured to meet the demands of various industrial and mechanical areas. According to the processing method, the stainless steel strip can be divided into cold rolled stainless steel strip and hot rolled stainless steel strip.

The final product typically consists of cold rolled steel that has been cut into strips of a specific widths and coiled or oscillate coiled for delivery, frequently interleaved with paper or another material which protects the surface finish of the material and assists in retaining oil or some other rust prevention solution. This product is often later stamped to form a part from the strip steel.
