= Market clearing =

Matching of supply and demand via price movement

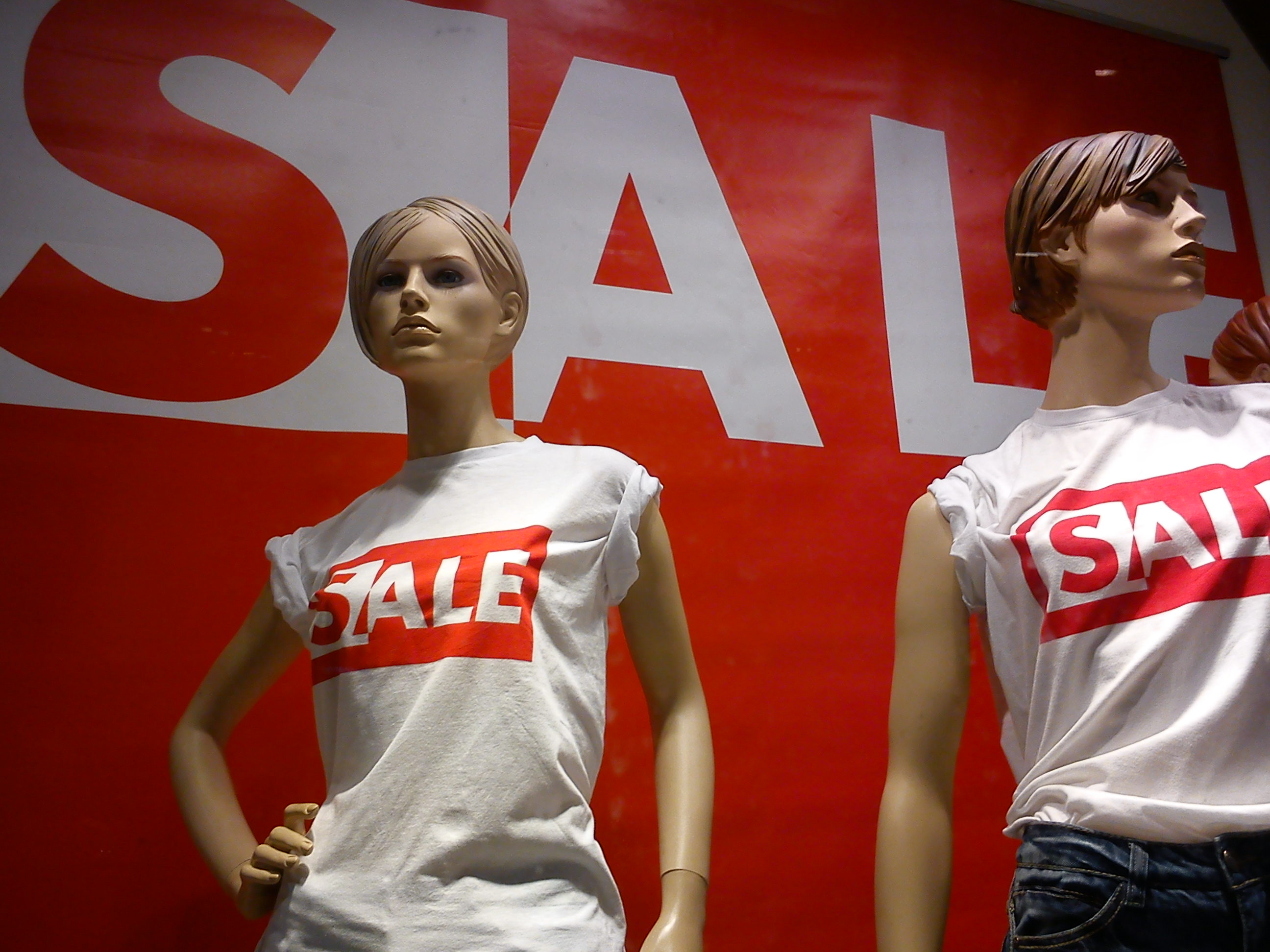
In retail stores, when a business ends up with too much of a certain product, which remains unsold at its longstanding price (such as unsold summer clothing as the colder season approaches), the store will typically discount the price until the excess stock is sold, a simple example of market clearing.

In economics, market clearing is the process by which, in an economic market, the supply of whatever is traded is equated to the demand so that there is no excess supply or demand, ensuring that there is neither a surplus nor a shortage. The new classical economics assumes that in any given market, assuming that all buyers and sellers have access to information and that there is no "friction" impeding price changes, prices constantly adjust up or down to ensure market clearing.

== Mechanism and examples ==
A market-clearing price is the price of a good or service at which the quantity supplied equals the quantity demanded, also called the equilibrium price. The theory claims that markets tend to move toward this price. Supply is fixed for a one-time sale of goods, so the market-clearing price is simply the maximum price at which all items can be sold. In a market where goods are produced and sold on an ongoing basis, the theory predicts that the market will move toward a price where the quantity supplied in a broad period of time will equal the quantity demanded. This might be measured over a week, month, or year to smooth out irregularities caused by manufacturing batches and delivery schedules; some sellers may maintain inventory buffers to ensure that products are always available for retail sale and to smooth out irregularities caused by manufacturing and delivery schedules, others employ Just-in-time manufacturing to increase profits in normal operations with the trade-off being greater disruption when irregularities do inevitably occur (eg. drastic market fluctuations, natural disasters, pandemics, power outages, etc...).

The market clears when the price reaches a point where demand and supply are in equilibrium, enabling individuals to buy or sell whatever they desire at that cost. When supply and demand are equal, a market clearing takes place. The market must experience a shortage or a surplus to reach this state. A shortage indicates that buyers are interested in purchasing something, but need help to afford to do so at current prices. Conversely, a surplus occurs when there is an excess product beyond the quantity that buyers are willing to purchase at current prices. New classical economics does not assume perfect information in the short run, but markets may approach efficient outcomes as information is discovered.

If the sale price exceeds the market-clearing price, supply will exceed demand, and a surplus inventory will build up over the long run. If the sale price is lower than the market-clearing price, then demand will exceed supply, and in the long run, shortages will result, where buyers sometimes find no products for sale at any price.

The market-clearing theory states that prices in a free market tend towards equilibrium, where the quantity of goods or services supplied equals the quantity demanded. The theory assumes that prices adjust quickly to any changes in supply or demand, meaning that markets can reach equilibrium instantaneously. For example, consider a scenario where a community experiences an earthquake that destroys all houses and apartments. The sudden demand for new housing will create a temporary shortage of houses and apartments in the market. However, if prices are free to change, construction companies will build new houses in the short run, while new companies will enter the house and apartment construction market in the longer run. As a result, the housing supply will increase, eventually reaching a point where it equals the new demand. This adjustment mechanism clears the shortage from the market, establishing a new equilibrium where the market is in balance. This adjustment process is critical in ensuring that markets operate efficiently, promoting economic growth and stability. This increase in production brings supply into harmony with the new demand. The adjustment mechanism has cleared the shortage from the market and established a new equilibrium. A similar mechanism is believed to operate when there is a market surplus (glut), where prices fall until all the excess supply is sold. An example of excess supply is Christmas decorations that are still in stores several days after Christmas; the stores that still have boxes of decorations view these products as excess supply, so prices are discounted until shoppers buy all the decorations (to keep them until next Christmas).

== History and non-ideal behavior ==
For 150 years (from approximately 1785 to 1935), most economists took the smooth operation of this market-clearing mechanism as inevitable and inviolable, based mainly on belief in Say's law. But the Great Depression of the 1930s caused many economists, including John Maynard Keynes, to doubt their classical faith. If markets were supposed to clear, how could ruinously high unemployment rates persist for so many painful years? Was the market mechanism not supposed to eliminate such surpluses? In one interpretation, Keynes identified imperfections in the adjustment mechanism that, if present, could introduce rigidities and make prices sticky. In another interpretation, price adjustment could worsen matters, causing what Irving Fisher called "debt deflation". Not all economists accept these theories. They attribute what appears to be imperfect clearing to factors like labor unions or government policy, thereby exonerating the clearing mechanism.

Most economists see the assumption of continuous market clearing as unrealistic. However, many see the concept of flexible prices as useful in the long-run analysis since prices are not stuck forever: market-clearing models describe the equilibrium economy gravitates towards. Therefore, many macro-economists feel that price flexibility is a reasonable assumption for studying long-run issues, such as growth in real GDP. Other economists argue that price adjustment may take so much time that the process of calibration may change the underlying conditions that determine long-run equilibrium. There may be path dependence, as when a long depression changes the nature of the "full employment" period that follows.

In the short run (and possibly in the long run), markets may find a temporary equilibrium at a price and quantity that does not correspond with the long-term market-clearing balance. For example, in the theory of "efficiency wages", a labor market can be in equilibrium above the market-clearing wage since each employer has the incentive to pay wages above market-clearing to motivate their employees. In this case, equilibrium wages (where there is no endogenous tendency for wages to change) would not be the same as market-clearing wages (where there is no classical unemployment).

== Flexibility in market clearing ==
In an unregulated and perfect market both labor market wages and product market prices are fully flexible and can change rapidly based on supply and demand. This flexibility ensures that neither the product nor the labor markets will experience an oversupply. If there is an oversupply of a product, its price will drop until buyers find it affordable, and in the case of a labor surplus, wages will decrease until employers can offer jobs to all willing workers. This mechanism ensures that every market tends towards equilibrium where supply meets demand. For instance, retailers may offer discounts on old cell phones and computers to sell them quickly and balance their inventory. The flexible pricing allows more people to buy these items, achieving market equilibrium.

== See also ==
- Double auction
- Economic equilibrium
- Supply and demand

== Sources ==
- "Market Clearing" in International Encyclopedia of the Social Sciences. Retrieved April 25, 2022 from Encyclopedia.com: https://www.encyclopedia.com/social-sciences/applied-and-social-sciences-magazines/market-clearing
- Scholar.harvard.edu. 2022. [online] Available at: <https://scholar.harvard.edu/files/gborjas/files/lechapter4.pdf> [Accessed 2 May 2022].
