= Rosa Matzkin =

American economist

Academic background
- Education: University of Minnesota (PhD); Israel Institute of Technology (BS)

Academic work
- Discipline: Econometrics, Microeconomics
- Institutions: University of California, Los Angeles

Rosa Matzkin is an economist who is the Charles E. Davidson Professor of Economics at the University of California, Los Angeles. In 2018 Matzkin was awarded membership to the American Academy of Arts and Sciences. She works in the fields of econometrics and microeconomic theory, including panel data models and the study of economic decision-making.

== Education ==
Rosa Matzkin received her Bachelor in Science from Israel Institute of Technology in 1981. Matzkin continued her education at the University of Minnesota where she received her Ph.D. in 1986.

== Work ==
Rosa Matzkin currently works at The University of California, Los Angeles where she is a professor of economics. Prior to her work at UCLA, Matzkin worked at Northwestern University and Yale University. She also had temporary positions at Caltech, University of Chicago, Massachusetts Institute of Technology, and University of Wisconsin.
