= Aggregation problem =

Concept in economics

In economics, an aggregate is a summary measure. It replaces a vector that is composed of many real numbers by a single real number, or a scalar. Consequently, there occur various problems that are inherent in the formulations that use aggregated variables.

The aggregation problem is the problem of finding a valid way to treat an empirical or theoretical aggregate as if it reacted like a less-aggregated measure, say, about behavior of an individual agent as described in general microeconomic theory (see representative agent and heterogeneity in economics).

The second meaning of "aggregation problem" is the theoretical difficulty in using and treating laws and theorems that include aggregate variables. A typical example is the aggregate production function. Another famous example is the Sonnenschein-Mantel-Debreu theorem, which casts doubt on the reliability of many macroeconomic theories, methodologies and results.

Disaggregation is the decomposition of an aggregate to variables closer to empirical data. Examples of aggregates in micro- and macroeconomics relative to disaggregated counterparts are:

Aggregate variable	Disaggregated components
Food basket	Apples, coffee
Price level (of basket)	Price level of apples, coffee
Price level of apples	Price level of green apples, red apples
Gross output of a nation	Total sales of a nation's apples, steel coils
A firm's capital stock	Value of a firm's buildings, steam shovels
Money supply	Savings deposits, vault cash, paper money
General unemployment rate	the unemployment rate of civil engineers, waiting staff

Standard theory uses simple assumptions to derive general, and commonly accepted, results such as the law of demand to explain market behavior. An example is the abstraction of a composite good. It considers the price of one good changing proportionately to the composite good, that is, all other goods. If this assumption is violated and the agents are subject to aggregated utility functions, restrictions on the latter are necessary to yield the law of demand. The aggregation problem emphasizes:

- How broad such restrictions are in microeconomics
- Use of broad factor inputs ("labor" and "capital"), real "output", and "investment", as if there was only a single such aggregate is without a solid foundation for rigorously deriving analytical results.

Franklin Fisher notes that this has not dissuaded macroeconomists from continuing to use such concepts.

== Aggregate consumer demand curve ==
The aggregate consumer demand curve is the summation of the individual consumer demand curves. The aggregation process preserves only two characteristics of individual consumer preference theory—continuity and homogeneity. Aggregation introduces three additional non-price determinants of demand:

- Number of consumers
- Distribution of tastes among the consumers
- Distribution of incomes among consumers of different taste

Thus if the population of consumers increases, ceteris paribus the demand curve will shift out; if the proportion of consumers with a strong preference for a good increases, ceteris paribus the demand for that good will change. Finally, if the distribution of income changes in favor of consumers who prefer the good in question, the demand will shift out. It is important to remember that factors that affect individual demand can also affect aggregate demand. However, net effects must be considered. The most important problem for micro- and macro-economics is the Sonnenschein–Mantel–Debreu theorem, which shows that almost no properties of the individual preference are inherited to the aggregate demand functions.

=== Difficulties with aggregation ===
==== Sonnenschein-Mantel-Debreu theorem ====
Sonnenschein-Mantel-Debreu theorem (SMD theorem) is a theorem for exchange economy that can be expressed in the following way:

for a function that is continuous, homogeneous of degree zero, and in accord with Walras's law, there is an economy with at least as many agents as goods such that, for prices bounded away from zero, the function is the aggregate demand function for this economy.

==== Independence assumption ====
First, to sum the demand functions without other strong assumptions it must be assumed that they are independent – that is, that one consumer's demand decisions are not influenced by the decisions of another consumer. For example, A is asked how many pairs of shoes he would buy at a certain price. A says at that price I would be willing and able to buy two pairs of shoes. B is asked the same question and says four pairs. Questioner goes back to A and says B is willing to buy four pairs of shoes, what do you think about that? A says if B has any interest in those shoes then I have none. Or A, not to be outdone by B, says "then I'll buy five pairs". And on and on. This problem can be eliminated by assuming that the consumers' tastes are fixed in the short run. This assumption can be expressed as assuming that each consumer is an independent idiosyncratic decision maker.

==== No interesting properties ====
This second problem is more serious. As David M. Kreps notes, “total demand will shift about as a function of how individual incomes are distributed even holding total (societal) income fixed. So it makes no sense to speak of aggregate demand as a function of price and societal income". Since any change in relative price brings about a redistribution of real income, there is a separate demand curve for every relative price. Kreps continues, "So what can we say about aggregate demand based on the hypothesis that individuals are preference/utility maximizers? Unless we are able to make strong assumptions about the distribution of preferences or income throughout the economy (everyone has the same homothetic preferences for example) there is little we can say”. The strong assumptions are that everyone has the same tastes and that each person's tastes remain the same as income changes so additional income is spent in exactly the same way as before.

Microeconomist Hal Varian reached a more muted conclusion: "The aggregate demand function will in general possess no interesting properties". However, Varian continued: "the neoclassical theory of the consumer places no restriction on aggregate behavior in general". This means the preference conditions (with the possible exception of continuity) simply do not apply to the aggregate function.

== See also ==
- Aggregate demand
- Aggregate supply
- Aggregate production function
- Cambridge capital controversy
- Ecological fallacy
- Price index
- Representative agent
- Methodological individualism
- Social choice theory
