= Reproduction (economics) =

In economics, recurrent or cyclical processes

In Marxian economics, economic reproduction refers to recurrent (or cyclical) processes. Michel Aglietta viewed economic reproduction as the process whereby the initial conditions necessary for economic activity to occur are constantly re-created. Marx viewed reproduction as the process by which society re-created itself, both materially and socially.

Economic reproduction involves:

- the physical production and distribution of goods and services,
- the trade (the circulation via exchanges and transactions) of goods and services,
- the consumption of goods and services (both productive or intermediate consumption and final consumption),
- the reproduction of voluntary and involuntary social relations, involving competition and cooperation (including the social relations of the class hierarchy).

Karl Marx developed the original insights of Quesnay to model the circulation of capital, money, and commodities in the second volume of Das Kapital to show how the reproduction process that must occur in any type of society can take place in capitalist society by means of the circulation of capital.

Marx distinguishes between "simple reproduction" and "expanded (or enlarged) reproduction". In the former case, no economic growth occurs, while in the latter case, more is produced than is needed to maintain the economy at the given level, making economic growth possible. In the capitalist mode of production, the difference is that in the former case, the new surplus value created by wage-labour is spent by the employer on consumption (or hoarded), whereas in the latter case, part of it is reinvested in production.

Ernest Mandel additionally refers in his two-volume Marxist Economic Theory to contracted reproduction, meaning production on a smaller and smaller scale, in which case business operating at a loss outnumbers growing business (e.g., in wars, depressions, or disasters). Reproduction in this case continues to occur, but investment, employment, and output fall absolutely, so that the national income falls. In the Great Depression of the 1930s, for example, about one-quarter of the workers became unemployed; as a result of the 2008–9 slump, the unemployed labour force increased by about 30 million workers (a number approximately equal to the total workforce of France, or Britain).

== Theoretical approach ==
As an approach to studying economic activity, economic reproduction contrasts with equilibrium economics, because economic reproduction is concerned not with statics or with how economic development gravitates towards an equilibrium, but rather with dynamics—that is, the motion of an economy. It is not concerned with the conditions of a perfect match between supply and demand under ideal conditions but rather with the quantitative proportions between different economic activities or sectors that are necessary in any real economy so that economic activity can continue and grow. It is concerned with all the conditions for that, including the social and technical conditions necessary for the economic process. Reproduction economics does not assume that society is kept in balance by market mechanisms.

Wassily Leontief developed Marx's idea further in his input-output economics (see also input-output model). However, there is a major difference between Leontief and Marx. By treating gross profit as a "factor input" as well as a factor output, the respective total values of the input and output in Leontief's model are always exactly equal. In Marx's model, the output in an accounting period is normally always higher in value than the input. This is what Marx believed capitalists to be in business for: to produce a product sold at a higher value than the sum of input costs, thus generating profit. The profit in Marx's theory is not an "input" (it is not part of the capital advanced), but a business result, the yield of capital on an investment.

In Marx's view, economic reproduction in any society has five main features:

- the production of reproducible products (goods or services) replacing, maintaining, or adding to the stock of society's physical assets
- the physical maintenance of the (working) population and their dependents through household consumption
- the reproduction and growth of the total population, including procreation and childrearing
- the reproduction, enforcement, and maintenance of social relations, in particular the relations of production that characterize the social hierarchy, and property rights
- the maintenance and reproduction of trading and distribution relations (the systems, institutions, and organizations enabling market trade and non-market allocation of resources)

What is specific to capitalist society is that these reproduction processes are accomplished primarily via the intermediary of commercial trade; that is, they are mediated by the market. Reproduction on a larger and larger scale becomes conditional on successfully making money. It means that these processes tend to be increasingly reorganized to bring them in line with the requirements of the accumulation of capital.

Marx's argument is that by producing an output value the equivalent to their own labor cost plus a surplus value (or gross profit) appropriated by capitalists, waged workers accomplish many of the processes involved at the same time. Part of the role of the state is to secure those general (collective) conditions for the reproduction and maintenance of society that individuals and private enterprise cannot secure by themselves for one reason or another (e.g., because they transcend competing interests, because they are too costly for private agencies, because it is technically not possible to privatize them, or because they are not sufficiently profitable or too risky). Ecologists would nowadays probably add as a "reproduction condition" good stewardship for the physical environment. Sustainable development cannot occur if the natural environment is constantly depleted without being restored. The recycling of wastes and waste materials can be considered as a necessary and integral part of society's reproduction process.

Each of these six features is the subject of much political controversy in society. Many different opinions exist about their relative importance and their effects on each other. Economists and businesspeople are often primarily concerned with the economic effects, but other intellectuals and workers are often more concerned with the non-economic effects for the health, security, and well-being of citizens. Thus, governments usually have both economic policies and social policies, population policies, environmental policies, and so on.

== Economic reproduction in capitalism ==
According to Marx, in a capitalist society, economic reproduction is conditional on capital accumulation. If workers fail to produce more capital, economic reproduction begins to break down. Therefore, economic reproduction in capitalist society is necessarily expanded reproduction and requires market growth. Capital must grow, otherwise the whole process breaks down. Thus, economic growth is not simply desirable but also necessary in capitalism, not just because of population growth, but for commercial reasons.

In this light, the ecological vision of a "zero-growth society" appears rather utopian; or, at the very least, its achievement would require the abolition of capitalism. Some would argue that population growth makes economic growth absolutely necessary. Others argue that population growth must be restricted with birth control methods because otherwise there will be too many people for the available resources. The real argument, though, is not about growth or the lack thereof, but rather about the kind of growth that is best for the (enlarged) reproduction of the human species as such. Ecologists may validly argue that some types of growth undermine important conditions for human survival in the longer term without invalidating other kinds of growth that are beneficial. However, there is much dispute about which kinds of economic growth are beneficial or harmful.

Capital accumulation (the amassing of wealth in the form of capital assets) can occur either by producing a net addition to the stock of capital assets or by transferring wealth from one owner to another. In the former case, the total stock of capital grows. In the latter case, the accumulation of one owner occurs at the expense of the other, there is no net growth. These two ways are usually combined, meaning that all or most owners make gains, but in unequal amounts. In considering the economic reproduction process as a whole, one therefore has to consider both the production of new resources and the transfer (distribution) of resources. As a corollary, supposing that there is no net growth of output and capital, capital accumulation can continue only if some people and organizations get richer while other people and organizations get poorer. Typically, if output growth slows down, socio-economic inequality (as measured, e.g., by the Gini coefficient) increases.

== Nine factors not theorized by Marx ==
There were nine main factors that Marx disregarded in his construction of reproduction schemes when he modelled the circulation of capital (through the constant transformations of money-capital into production-capital and commodity-capital and vice versa). These omissions have been noted by various Marxist and non-Marxist authors.

- The sphere of consumption. Marx did not go into detail about how capitalist business reshapes, reorganizes, and restructures the mode of consumption so that it becomes more profitable. He concerned himself primarily with the capitalist mode of production, not with the capitalist mode of consumption.

- Unproductive accumulation. Through successive cycles of economic reproduction, more and more capital assets are created that exist outside the sphere of capitalist production. These capital assets include residential housing; improved and unimproved land; publicly owned physical assets including offices, hospitals, schools, roads, installations, parks, vehicles, equipment, and infrastructural works; consumer durables; and all kinds of financial assets.These assets can also yield profits, income gains, or capital gains insofar as they are tradeable goods or rented out. For example, there is nowadays a large trade in used cars, second-hand equipment, and housing, as well as in financial assets. In fact, in developed capitalist countries, the capital directly tied up in private-sector means of production (i.e., the productive investment capital of private enterprises) is nowadays only the minor part of the total physical capital assets of society (i.e., a quarter or one-fifth); if financial assets are included, the proportion of this part shrinks even more (to one-sixth to one-eighth of the total capital).

- Human capital and labour markets. Marx did not analyze the effects of human capital—that is, the skills and knowledge lodged in the physical bodies of workers, and the very large sums of money invested into education systems. He was aware of the idea of human capital, but he regarded it as a fictitious, reified notion that, he argued, would imply that workers were really capitalists. Nevertheless, the stock of skills and knowledge in the economy can represent a very large tradable value, which can profoundly influence economic relationships, insofar as workers can increase their income because they possess specialized skills and knowledge. Considerable money is spent on education and research and development in developed capitalist countries. Marx intended to write a separate study about the labour market, considering the different forms that wages could take, but he never did.

- Rent seeking. Marx did not analyze the effects of "rent-seeking" for economic reproduction. In conventional economics, the term "rent-seeking" was coined in 1974, and refers mainly to a form of parasitism or economic opportunism by government bureaucrats in a privileged position (though sometimes it is applied to firms and business managers). Definitions of "economic rent" are much disputed in economic theory, but in radical theory they refer to an unearned income (which may be conceptualized as being not a true "factor-income" but rather an income in excess of factor-income) that derives from a favorable trading position or from the monopolization of a resource. Marx only considered the special case of land rent ("ground rent"), but modern theorists argue that the scope of economic rents has become much larger. If investors can earn rents simply by capitalizing on the ownership or use of a resource (and make money simply by trading in the ownership of assets, which may themselves be borrowed assets), then, if this sort of activity makes more profit faster, with less risk and lower tax than investing in production, capital will shift more and more to trade in already existing assets. If there exist plenty of such assets, a very large trade in such assets can develop, causing speculative bubbles. The result is that output growth is curbed and may even turn negative. Thus, the relative proportions of industry profits, interest, and rent income in total surplus value have a decisive effect on the ability of the economy to grow. The more the interest and rent that must be paid for production to occur, the more this becomes a constraint for expanding production. If the population increases, output, investments, and jobs necessarily have to grow to keep up with it; but in a complex system of financial intermediation involving rent seeking, economic growth may fail to occur on a sufficient scale, and in that case, some groups can only improve their economic position at the expense of others. This argument, however, is also disputed by many theorists; the objection is simply that well-developed capital and money markets ensure that the finance exists to develop production, and that without a strong financial sector, production would be starved of funds.

- Non-capitalist economic areas. In his theory of capital, Marx failed to consider the importance and weight of the non-capitalist production activities that must occur to sustain capitalist production (a significant component of which is household labour; see below). He was primarily concerned to show that the reproduction of society as a whole could in principle be accomplished by means of the accumulation of capital. All the activities of economic production can, Marx argued, in principle be organized in a capitalist way (according to commercial logic). It supplied proof that the capitalist mode of production could exist as an historically distinctive world system, completely dominated by the requirements of capital, without quickly breaking down. But this idea was strongly criticized, especially by German Marxist authors such as Rosa Luxemburg and Fritz Sternberg. They argued that capital accumulation proceeds only by constantly drawing upon a non-capitalist "hinterland" or region. That is, markets can expand only if there are new, non-capitalist areas to expand into; but inversely, these non-capitalist areas could actually support the capitalist economy well in advance of becoming thoroughly organized according to commercial principles. Many Marxists have demonstrated the mistake(s) of Luxemburg in misunderstanding Marx's reproduction Schema. In Limits to Capital and In Nature, Difference and the Geography of Justice, David Harvey finds that a closed capitalist system could balance the various factors of production and successful expanded reproduction (without recourse to non-capitalist, or other "outside" factors)is possible. Whilst rejecting the necessity of expanding into non-capitalist areas for successful accumulation to take place, Harvey does recognize that in neoliberalism the privatization of the public sector, including partial privatization via P3s, as well as outsourcing, subcontracting, giving away new science to private firms etc. constitutes a new kind of "accumulation by dispossession" . Lewis in his Nobel prize winning Theory of Economic Growth and model of economic development argued the opposite – that the capitalist sector raises wages, drawing unproductive labour out of the non-capitalist sector, creating a self-sustaining process of economic development.

- Population growth. Marx failed to systematically theorize the impact of demographic effects on economic reproduction, except that he studied the reserve army of labour and criticized the "overpopulation" theories of Thomas Malthus. Malthus was anxious that population growth would outstrip the capacity of the economy to sustain all the new people. Marx replied that the very idea of "overpopulation" was an anti-human ideological fiction, since it really meant "overpopulation" only relative to the requirements of capital accumulation. If resources were appropriately allocated, there was enough for everybody to have a decent life. The real point was that capital could not achieve that goal. Capital accumulation necessitated a "relative surplus population", which tended to grow in size. Nevertheless, since population trends are not simply determined by economic factors, population movements can exert an important independent effect on economic reproduction. In China population growth has been curbed by deliberate government policy to restrict the number of births per couple, using birth control methods. Another aspect about which there is much controversy is the emigration of workers and refugee populations, whether they are an asset for, or a drain on, economic growth. Capitalists are generally in favor of the free international movement of capital, but they are much more cautious about freedom of movement for workers, depending on whether that movement is profitable to them or whether it is a cost or a political threat.

- Public finance. Marx did not analyze in any detail the effect of taxation and state expenditures on the reproduction process. In his time, state taxes and expenditures were comparatively small (5%–10% of gross product), but since that time they have risen to 30%–40% or more of gross product in many countries. They enable the state to intervene directly in the process of social and economic reproduction, and to alter its course within certain limits. Because of the size of state funds and the fact that taxes must be paid irrespective of productive performance, the state can borrow large sums and use them, together with legislation, to influence economic growth and social relations. In addition, the state nowadays also employs a very large number of people earning incomes from activity that is often or mostly not oriented to profit making, analogous to a non-profit sector sustained by subsidies, grants, and donations, as well as some income-generating activity. The state is the largest sponsor and purchaser of the military industry supplying the armed forces.

- Ecology. Although he did refer to it, Marx did not analyze in detail the depletion of natural resources by capitalist production, where the depletion involves non-reproducible goods, or living organisms that are wiped out. If land is exhausted or becomes infertile, or if it is devastated by a natural disaster, or if the yield of mines, forests, and fisheries becomes too low, production can no longer continue. After a series of cycles of capitalist reproduction, environments may emerge that are no longer inhabitable by human beings because they are incapable any longer of sustaining life.

- International division of labor. Through mechanization and productivity increases achieved by capitalist production, the allocation of human labour between agriculture, manufacturing industries, and services (the so-called primary, secondary, and tertiary sectors of the economy) is altered nationally and internationally. In developed capitalist countries, the agricultural labour force has shrunk to only a tiny fraction of the total workforce, and manufacturing industries remain only as a minor part of total production; the large majority of workers are employed in service industries. This contrasts with less-developed countries, which retain a large agricultural workforce, and newly industrializing countries, which feature a large manufacturing workforce. Marx did not analyze the implications of these long-term effects of the expansion of production by means of capital accumulation.

In assessing the effect of these "omissions", one ought to keep in mind that when Marx discussed the intertwining of the circulation of capital with the reproduction processes that occur in any kind of society, he was primarily concerned with the functional requirements of the capitalist mode of production and not with the reproduction of the whole of society. At any time, a fraction of the population is not working or "economically active" (children, students, the sick and disabled, the unemployed, volunteer workers, housewives, pensioners, idlers, etc.), and assets are maintained or accumulated that are unrelated to the sphere of production. These were generally outside the scope of Marx's analysis, even if he occasionally mentioned them.

== Economic reproduction, economic equilibrium, and economic crises ==
Marx's models of economic reproduction in capitalism have often been interpreted as stating the conditions for economic equilibrium, or balanced economic growth. After all, there are certain "necessary proportions" between different branches of production, which have to adjust their output levels to each other. If those proportions do not reach a minimum acceptable level, then products remain unsold or producers cannot obtain the inputs they require, in which case production begins to slow down or break down. So there are necessary proportions between production, distribution, and consumption that must be maintained if society is to survive and grow. In this sense, Marx distinguishes between the production of means of production, consumer goods, and luxury goods, and he considers the commercial interactions between the sectors producing them.

If the growth of different sectors of production occurs very unevenly, bottlenecks can occur, so that a supply or demand cannot be met. In the worst case, an interruption in the normal reproduction process triggers a sequence of disturbances, a chain reaction, which spreads from some branches of production to the whole economy, meaning that products are left unsold and that producers receive insufficient income to pay their bills. The result is rising unemployment, idle productive capacity, and a drop in output and productive investment. This in turn means lower economic growth.

- Disproportionality theories. This idea was the basis for numerous Marxist crisis theories devised in the first three decades of the 20th century, most famously by Rudolf Hilferding, Rosa Luxemburg, Nikolai Bukharin, Otto Bauer, and Henryk Grossmann. The argument is that balanced economic growth is only a temporary phenomenon, because a private enterprise economy is incapable of sustaining the necessary proportionalities required. It cannot do so because there is no overall, conscious coordination of production activities in an economic system in which producers compete to cut costs, increase sales, and increase profits. There has been much dispute about which disproportionalities exactly are of decisive importance and why those specific disproportionalities would occur and recur, but all these theorists agree that some disproportionalities must necessarily occur, making recurrent crises inevitable.
- Uneven development theories. Other theorists such as Ernest Mandel and Roman Rosdolsky argued that capitalist economic development is always an "imbalanced" rather than "balanced" development in space and time. At most, an approximate balance of supply and demand is achieved in particular areas. In that case, an economic equilibrium never exists in reality; it is only a theoretical abstraction. There are constant market fluctuations as producers adjust to each other without being able to determine how much others will produce for sale. At most, one could say that in times of strong economic growth, when markets strongly expand, all producers can make gains from increasing output, even if the gains are unequal. But after a certain time, productive investment will "overshoot" a now saturated market demand, causing the economy to spiral into crisis again.

The basis for this alternative interpretation is that as long as simple reproduction is at least accomplished, expanded reproduction permits considerable variations, possibilities, and flexibilities (elasticities); the gross profit income of enterprises can, within certain limits, be used or reinvested in many different ways without causing any critical disturbance of the economic reproduction process as a whole. The higher labor productivity is and the larger the surplus product, the more discretionary wealth exists. The less that basic necessities (food, clothing, housing, cellphones, etc.) cost as a fraction of the disposable household budget, the more funds are available to be spent optionally or saved. In addition, the extension of credit can compensate for temporary supply-demand imbalances. So while certain minimal quantitative conditions do exist for the proportionalities of outputs among different branches of production, these proportionalities can be maintained, even if the output growth rate per year drops, say from 4% to 2%. Provided that the capitalist relations of production are stable and secure, capital accumulation will continue, despite constant market fluctuations, at a slower or faster pace. Society will reproduce itself anyway, but at a lower or higher standard of living.

In this case, models of economic reproduction are not a useful guide to understanding economic crises because, it is argued, Marx only intended them to show how it was possible for the whole economic reproduction process to be accomplished on the basis of the circulation of capital, by stating the minimum requirements (not the equilibrium conditions) for it. If certain quantitative assumptions are made about the growth rates of different sectors and about capital compositions, it can be proved that certain disproportions must necessarily develop. But in reality, the economic reproduction process could be interrupted or break down for all kinds of reasons (including non-economic causes, such as wars or disasters). And if disproportions occur, the economic system can also adjust to them, within certain limits. If vastly more capital assets are created than are invested in production, one cannot explain economic crises simply in terms of disproportionalities in the sphere of production; one has to look at the process of capital accumulation as a whole, which includes the financial system, non-productive assets, and real estate. This becomes particularly important when large debt crises occur. These debt crises signal that serious misallocations of capital have occurred, which impact negatively on economic reproduction.

- Financialization theories. A third, more recent interpretation is that the reproduction process (both the material reproduction processes and the reproduction of capital) has become completely dominated by capital finance. Hence, to explain economic crises, critical disproportions between the developments of branches of production, or unutilized capacity ought to be viewed as emerging out of specific financial and monetary regimes pursued by financial institutions and the state. The large funds commanded by these organizations are thought to shape the whole character of the reproduction process. As analysts like Michael Hudson like to point out, ordinary consumers in developed countries today have little in common anymore with how economists portray them in their models, because in reality consumers are using the majority of what they earn to pay interest, premiums, rent and debt principal to the financial industry (finance, insurance and real estate). Consumers spend less than a quarter or less than 20% of their earnings on actual goods and services. Just as Marx noted a progression from natural economy to a "money-economy" and then a "credit economy", it is argued that the reproduction process has now become dominated by the supply, demand, or withdrawal of credit-money. However, there is much theoretical controversy about exactly how the relationship between the "real economy" (the direct involvement with the production and consumption of goods and services) and the "financial economy" (the circuit of trade in financial claims) should be understood. There is not much consensus about the effects of different financial policies by government and business on the economy, or how one could prove what the effects are.

Arguably, much of the confusion in the debates about economic reproduction is attributable to two basic errors:

- Definition of capitalism. Scholars often confuse Marx's idea about what is required for the reproduction of the capitalist mode of production (bringing together the factors of production to make money) with what is required for the reproduction of capitalist society as a whole. Abstractly, it is assumed that the economy consists only of capitalist production and that the capitalist economy is equal to capitalist society. But in reality this is not the case. Capitalist society contains all sorts of non-economic processes and non-capitalist processes as well. It remains a society of human beings, who have certain requirements or needs that cannot easily be met through a commercial business. And the majority of capital assets in developed capitalist countries are, even though they attract profit, not physical means of production, but financial assets or non-productive physical assets such as real estate or durables. This can be easily verified from national capital stock and asset inventory data (provided in national accounts or flow of funds tables).
- Physical/social distinction. Scholars often conflate the (expanded) physical reproduction of goods and services necessary for human survival with the (expanded) reproduction of capital. They assume that a certain market balance or market proportionality is essential for an equilibrium growth path. In fact, Marx never argued that capitalist society is "held together" or "balanced out" by the market itself, and he denied that equilibrium ever existed anywhere, other than as a momentary coincidence. Instead, "what held society together" was the compulsion to produce and reproduce for a living, given a system of property rights enforced by the state. Marxists call this viewpoint Marx's historical materialism.

Once the basic needs of all could be met and organized capitalistically, the further development of capital accumulation could take directions quite unrelated to the direct requirements of economic reproduction. Indeed, this was also part of Marx's critique of capitalism: significant funds could be invested in ways that did not benefit society at all, with the effect that activities and assets essential to maintain society's well-being might be starved of funds. That is, within certain absolute limits, the requirements for physical reproduction and for capital accumulation might not be the same at all. Capital would be invested for profit, but basic necessities might be ignored. An example might be the 2007–2008 world food price crisis, which indicates that insufficient capital has been invested in food production.

This might seem strange, since food is a basic requirement of human life. But, as Marx would presumably argue, what makes a profit is not necessarily what people really need, and therefore the possibility exists that profit making may undermine the most basic conditions for economic reproduction, including the supply of food and clean water, sanitation, adequate shelter, schooling, health care, and the like. These conditions are undermined not because capitalists dislike investing in these things—they might love to invest in them, if they could—but rather because it is difficult to make a secure profit from doing so. The required investments may be very large and long term, tying up capital for many years, but either there is no possibility for profit or it is uncertain whether a sufficient profit can and will be made. If, for example, foreign investors invested in a country's essential infrastructure, a falling currency exchange rate some years later might wipe out the profits they could get. Therefore, such investments could occur only if foreign or local government authorities (and ultimately taxpayers) subsidized them (or at any rate, if they acted as a guarantor for the investments), or if financial institutions could find sufficient financial insurance to protect the value of investment capital through terms that reduce financial risk to investors.

== Reproduction of labor power ==
Reproduction can also refer to the worker's daily reproduction of his or her own labor power. This consists of the tasks of everyday existence—food preparation, laundry, and so forth—that maintain the worker and his or her ability to work. Since roughly the 16th century, much of this domestic labor has been made the responsibility of women, through various developments put in motion by powerful institutions in the transition period from feudalism to capitalism. Adding to the process of social degradation of women in that period was the devaluation of the reproduction of labor. As Silvia Federici notes, "In the new monetary regime, only production-for-market was defined as value-creating activity, whereas the reproduction of the worker began to be considered as valueless from an economic viewpoint and even ceased to be considered as work". Thus it is of particular interest in feminist economics. For example, it was reported in 1988 that the paid work done by both men and women outside the home in West Germany totalled 55,000 million hours a year, earning them a total of $335 billion; but housework done by women inside the home totalled 53,000 million hours a year, which earned them no salary at all.

One of the principal inventors of modern national accounts, Simon Kuznets, did at one time suggest that the value of household labour should be estimated as a standard measure, even just for the sake of objectivity about the economy, but that argument was rejected. He stated:

"The productive activities of housewives and other family members, rendered within the family circle…are an important complement to the market-eventuating process in supplying goods to ultimate consumers, and should be considered in any attempt to evaluate the net product of the social system in terms of satisfying wants with scarce means."

Later, the economist Robert Eisner tried to estimate the value of "non-market outputs". His calculations suggested that in the United States, the value of unpaid household work declined from about 45% of conventional Gross National Product in 1945 to about 33% in 1981.

== See also ==
- Comparative statics
- law of value
- labour power
