= Exchange economy =

Exchange economy is technical term used in microeconomics research to describe interaction between several agents. In the market, the agent is the subject of exchange and the good is the object of exchange. Each agent brings his/her own endowment, and they can exchange products among them based on a price system. Two types of exchange economy are studied:

- In a pure exchange economy, all agents are consumers; there is no production and all agents can do is exchange their initial endowments. In daily research, to avoid research difficulties caused by a large number of consumers and goods, the simple trading conditions of two consumers and two goods are usually assumed.
- In contrast, in an exchange economy with production, some or all agents are firms that may also produce new goods.

A major interesting question regarding an exchange economy is if and when the economy attains a competitive equilibrium. Exchange and distribution efficiency are concerned.

== Pure exchange economy ==
- A pure exchange economy is the simplest form of exchange in the exchange economy. Assuming that each consumer has a certain amount of initial resources (endowment) that can be used for exchange, and every consumer has their own preferences. When the price is given or stable, the Pareto optimal allocation can be found.

== Production Exchange Economy ==
- In a production exchange economy, it is assumed that consumers accept the price given by the market and exchange voluntarily, to achieve the optimal distribution.

== Information ==
- Information has a certain value in the exchange economy. Consumers are more likely to exchange when the market has provided enough information. However, information disclosure plays a different role in a pure exchange economy and a production exchange economy. In a pure exchange economy, the disclosure of information can help consumers conduct risk assessments. In the production exchange economy, information disclosure can help consumers optimize asset allocation.

== See also ==
- Market economy
- Barter
- Pareto Optimality
- Edgeworth Box
- Walrasian Equilibrium
- Welfare Economics
