= Mordecai Kurz =

American academic

- Born: November 29, 1934 (age 91)

Academic background
- Education: Yale University

Academic work
- Discipline: Economics
- Institutions: Stanford University
- Notable ideas: Growth Theory; General equilibrium; Game theory; Public economics; Labor economics; Income distribution

Mordecai Kurz (born November 29, 1934) is an American economist whose research work has covered a variety of problems in economic theory and policy. He has written extensively on growth theory, game theory, the formation of beliefs, and the effect of market power on inequality and growth, and he has worked on various policy projects. He contributed to the design of minimum income guarantee experiments in Seattle and Denver from 1971 to 1975, and in Manitoba in 1974. He also served as a special economic advisor to President Carter's Commission on Pension Policy in 1979.

== Education ==
Kurz is the Joan M. Kenney Professor of Economics, emeritus at Stanford University and was the economics director of Stanford's Institute for Mathematical Studies in the Social Sciences from 1971 to 1989. He was a Guggenheim Fellow (1977), a fellow of the Institute for Advanced Studies of the Hebrew University in Jerusalem (1979) and has been a fellow of the Econometric Society since 1971. Kurz was a Stanford research associate (1961), assistant professor at Stanford (1962), lecturer at the Hebrew University of Jerusalem (1963–1966), associate professor of economics at Stanford University (1966–1968) and full professor (1969-).

His work on the theory of rational beliefs was influential in moving financial and macroeconomists away from the assumption of perfectly rational expectations. The theory of rational beliefs offered an explanation for the heterogeneity in investment behavior and, consequently, in returns. In 2004, a Festschrift was published in his honor on the topic, entitled Assets, Beliefs, and Equilibria in Economic Dynamics: Essays in Honor of Mordecai Kurz. It was edited by Charalambos Aliprantis, Kenneth Arrow, Peter Hammond, Felix Kubler, Ho-Mou Wu and Nicholas C. Yannelis.

== Research ==
Kurz argues that technological innovations in a market economy perpetually plant new seeds of market power since private ownership of technology awards the owner monopoly power with a major advantage over competitors. Firms use diverse strategies to expand their market power and make it a durable feature of an unregulated, laissez-faire, capitalist economy. Absent strong public policy to constrain it, firms’ market power expands causing inequality to expand to a level that turns democracy into plutocracy. This dynamic process leads Kurz to some important assessments.

(i) History. Kurz finds that the US has experienced rising market power at the turn of the 20th century and a second time since 1981, which Kurz calls the “Second Gilded Age”.

(ii) Profits and inequality. Kurz has maintained that in an unregulated market economy, the above process generates rising monopoly profits that are concentrated in few hands. The rest of society, particularly low skilled workers, pay the cost of technological progress. It takes the form of income that either declines over time or grows slower than income of the recipients of profits. Consequently, the rich minority gets richer at the expense of the majority, who are mostly workers without college education who are uncompensated for their losses.

(iii) The stock market. In 2016 Kurz defined “Monopoly Wealth” to be the wealth created by market power. It is the present value of claims to future monopoly profits due to market power. In 2019 monopoly wealth was so high that 75% of the value of all stocks was monopoly wealth. Kurz asserts that corporate capital investment is mostly financed by debt, and stock trading is mostly the trading of monopoly wealth.

(iv)Technological Competition. Competition does not solve the problem of rising market power since technological competition is different from regular competition. It has only one or few winners who succeed in innovating a superior technology but then acquire market power of their own. Incumbent monopolists can reinvent themselves and often win a technological race so that most innovations are actually made either by incumbents or by small innovating firms that are acquired by a leading incumbent.

(v) The stability of democracy. Democracy under unregulated free market capitalism is an unstable social system. A small minority enjoys rising monopoly profits while the rest of society, particularly low-skilled workers, pay the cost of social transformation caused by technology. It results in the loss of social cohesion and rise of division, polarization and social strife. With the rich getting richer at the expense of the poor, it is only a matter of time before the less fortunate feel abandoned by democratic institutions and lose faith in democracy. They are the best target of demagogues that subvert democracy.

(vi) Criticism of the Sherman Antitrust Act. Kurz is critical of the current antitrust laws, saying they are the wrong tool to address rising market power. The Sherman Antitrust regime, patent law and Supreme Court decisions, all exempt technological market power.

(vii) Antitrust. Kurz favors expanded antitrust enforcement. While some oppose antitrust on the grounds that it penalizes the most successful for being successful, he argues that it would be beneficial for consumers to limit the growth of monopoly wealth created by the successful firms. This for is two reasons. First, a successful superstar firm impedes the growth of its competitors with many different strategies that are often hard to detect, as was the case with Netscape and Microsoft. Second, a policy to prevent a superstar firm from growing beyond a certain size enables other firms to grow, increase their productivity and market share, and increase the equilibrium number of firms and of competing products. He demonstrates that such a policy is welfare-improving.

(viii) Policy advocacy. Kurz has published widely on policy proposals to remedy the ills caused, he believes, by market power. According to him, a good policy must permit initial market power as an incentive to innovators, but the policy must also broaden the goal of Sherman Antitrust to blocking the expansion of this initial market power beyond the level permitted by patent law. This calls for regulating firms with technological market power to ensure it dissipates rapidly and is prevented from becoming a permanent feature. Patent law must be revised, technological acquisitions must be limited and other tactics used by technology firms must be prohibited. He supports reforming labor laws to allow easier unionization to improve working conditions, attain a better balance of power in the labor market and improve management-labor cooperation.

(ix) Views on the Biden Administration The laissez-faire policy introduced in the 1980s resulted in rising market power and inequality, combined with increases in social division and strife. A similar process under a free market policy during the Progressive era was reversed, starting in 1901, with actions and policies introduced by the reform minded President Theodore Roosevelt. In our time, the Biden administration came into power in January 2021 with growing demand for broad reforms of the role of government. Kurz suggests that the economic policy of the Biden administration, stressing active government investments in infrastructure and environment, offers the first sign of a policy reversal. It is likely to lead to a much broader reform agenda that will take some years to develop.

== Publications ==
=== Books ===
Public Investment, the Rate of Return, and Optimal Fiscal Policy (with K. J. Arrow), the Johns Hopkins Press, Baltimore (1970). Endogenous Economic Fluctuations: Studies in the Theory of Rational Beliefs, Mordecai Kurz (ed.), Springer Series in Economic Theory, No. 6, Springer Verlag, August 1997. The Market Power of Technology: Understanding the Second Gilded Age. Columbia University Press, New York (2023).

=== Selected journal articles ===
- "The General Instability of a Class of Growth Processes," Review of Economic Studies (April 1967); 155–74.
- "The Seattle Experiment: The Combined Effect of Income Maintenance and Manpower Investments" (with R. G. Spiegelman), American Economic Review (May 1971); 22–9.
- "Power and Taxes" (with R. Aumann), Econometrica (July 1977); 1137–61.
- "Endogenous Formation of Coalitions" (with S. Hart), Econometrica (July 1983); 1047–64.
- "On the Structure and Diversity of Rational Beliefs," Economic Theory 4 (1994), 877–900.
