= Nicholas C. Yannelis =

Professor at the University of Iowa

- Born: 9 November 1953 (age 72); Athens, Greece

Academic background
- Education: Athens School of Economics, London School of Economics, University of Rochester
- Doctoral advisor: M. Ali Khan; Lionel W. McKenzie

Academic work
- Discipline: general equilibrium and game theory Mathematical economics
- Institutions: University of Illinois and University of Manchester and The University of Iowa

Nicholas C. Yannelis (Greek: Νικόλαoς Γιανvέλης; born 1953) is the Henry B. Tippie Research Professor of Economics and Applied Mathematics and Computation at the University of Iowa. He is an emeritus Commerce Distinguished Alumni Professor of Economics at the University of Illinois at Urbana-Champaign. Also he was the Sir Johns Hicks Professor of Economics at the University of Manchester. His research includes the study of equilibrium concepts in games and economies with asymmetric information; equilibrium in infinite dimensional commodity spaces; equilibrium in games and economies with discontinuous preferences; and equilibrium theory and implementation under ambiguity. He has also done works in pure mathematics.

== Biography ==
Yannelis studied undergraduate economics at the Athens University of Economics, and pursued graduate studies at the London School of Economics and the University of Rochester. He was awarded a Ph.D. in economics at the University of Rochester under the direction of Lionel W. McKenzie.

Yannelis is the editor of Economic Theory since 2009, Economic Theory Bulletin since 2013, Studies in Economic Theory since 1991, and the associate editor of the Journal of Mathematical Economics since 1993.

Yannelis became an Economic Theory Fellow in 2011. Together with C. D. Aliprantis and Edward C. Prescott, he founded in 1991 the Society for the Advancement of Economic Theory.

== Research ==
Nicholas C. Yannelis's early work was focused on infinite dimensional general equilibrium theory and the Aumann-Shapley value allocation. To study new problems in general equilibrium theory, Yannelis proved new mathematical results, including continuous selection theorems, Caratheodory-Type Selection Theorems, the Fatou's Lemma in infinite dimensional spaces, fixed points for discontinuous correspondences, and the upper and lower semicontinuity of set-valued functions in Banach spaces. He subsequently focused on general equilibrium theory with asymmetric information. He proposed the notion of private core and an incentive compatible notion, and further contributed to the Aumann-Shapley values by introducing differential information. Yannelis was the first to model perfect competition in an asymmetric information economy. Yannelis has worked on games and economies with discontinuous preferences. His analysis of payoff discontinuity extends the classical results in abstract economies with non-ordered preferences. Another line of his current research focuses on the ambiguity aversion in economies and games. He has shown that there is no conflict between efficiency and incentive compatibility in the presence of maximin expected utilities, which is generally false in a model with Bayesian decision making agents.

== Books ==
- Khan, M. Ali; Yannelis, Nicholas (1991). Equilibrium Theory in Infinite Dimensional Spaces. Studies in Economic Theory. Vol. 1. Springer. ISBN 978-3-540-54480-7.
- Glycopantis, Dionysius; Yannelis, Nicholas (2004). Differential Information Economies. Studies in Economic Theory. Vol. 19. Springer. ISBN 978-3-540-21424-3.
