= Makoto Yano =

Japanese economist (born 1952)

- 矢野誠
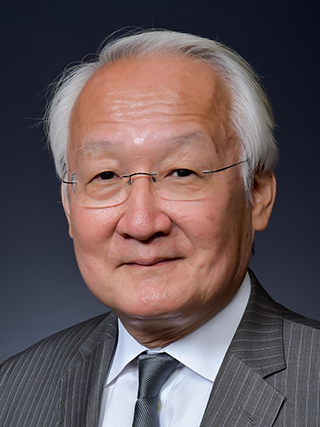
- Makoto Yano in 2020
- Born: 27 May 1952 (age 74); Tokyo, Japan

Academic background
- Education: University of Rochester (Ph.D. 1981); University of Tokyo (B.A. 1977)
- Influences: Takashi Negishi; Lionel W. McKenzie; Ronald W. Jones

Academic work
- Discipline: Market quality economics; General Equilibrium Theory; International trade theory
- Institutions: Research Institute of Economy, Trade, and Industry; Kyoto University; Keio University; Yokohama National University; Rutgers University; Cornell University
- Website: Information at IDEAS / RePEc

Makoto Yano (Japanese: 矢野誠, Hepburn: Yano Makoto; born 27 May 1952) is a Japanese economist, currently the president and chief research officer of the Research Institute of Economy, Trade and Industry (RIETI]). He is also a professor emeritus at Kyoto University and a professor by special appointment at Kyoto University's Institute of Economic Research and Sophia University.

== Biography ==
Yano completed undergraduate study at Tokyo University in 1977 before moving to the United States to pursue graduate studies at the University of Rochester. At Rochester, he focused on dynamic general equilibrium theory and trade theory, working with Lionel W. McKenzie and Ronald. W. Jones as his thesis advisors. After receiving his Ph.D. from Rochester in 1981, Yano taught at Cornell University and Rutgers University before returning to Japan in 1986. Before assuming his current position with RIETI, he spent more than ten years as a professor at Kyoto University's Institute of Economic Research Institute, including two years as Chair of the Institute and five years as Head of the institute's Research Center for Advanced Policy Studies.Before joining Kyoto University, he also served as a professor on the Faculties of Economics at Keio University and Yokohama National University. He is a founding editor of the International Journal of Economic Theory, and has served as President of the Japanese Economic Association from April 1, 2008, to March 31, 2009 and as Managing Editor of the Japanese Economic Review.

== Contributions ==
Yano is known for his contributions in the field of dynamic general equilibrium theory (Turnpike theory). He is also known for his work in incorporating chaos theory into economic theory. In recent years, he has developed a new field of market quality economics that measures the efficiency of allocation and the fairness of dealing and pricing.

== Selected publications ==
- Yano, M. (2009). "The Foundation of Market Quality Economics". Japanese Economic Review. 60 (1): 1–32. doi:10.1111/j.1468-5876.2008.00471.x.
- Yano, M.; Nugent, J. (1999). "Aid, Non-Traded Goods and the Transfer Paradox in Small Countries". American Economic Review. 89 (3): 431–449. doi:10.1257/aer.89.3.431.
- Yano, M. (1998). "On the Dual Stability of a von Neumann Facet and the Inefficacy of Temporary Fiscal Policy". Econometrica. 66 (2). doi:10.2307/2998565. JSTOR 2998565.
- Nishimura, K.; Yano, M. (1995). "Non-Linear Dynamics and Chaos in Optimal Growth: An Example". Econometrica. 63 (4). doi:10.2307/2171805. JSTOR 2171805.
- Weller, P.; Yano, M. (1987). "Forward Exchange, Futures Trading and Spot Price Variability: A General Equilibrium Approach". Econometrica. 55 (6): 1433–1450. doi:10.2307/1913565. JSTOR 1913565.
- Yano, M. (1984). "The Turnpike of Dynamic General Equilibrium Paths in Its Insensitivity to Initial Conditions". Journal of Mathematical Economics. 13 (3): 235–254. doi:10.1016/0304-4068(84)90032-6.
- McKenzie, L.; Yano, M. (1980). "Turnpike Theory: Some Corrections". Econometrica. 48. doi:10.2307/1911942. JSTOR 1911942.
