= Ishac Diwan =

Lebanese economist

- Born: 1957 (age 68–69)
- Title: Director of Research Centre pour la recherche économique et ses applications

Academic background
- Education: University of California at Berkeley

Ishac Diwan (born 1957 in Beirut, Lebanon) is a prominent Lebanese economist. He currently teaches economics at l'École normale supérieure as well as the American University of Beirut. He is also the Director of Research at the Finance for Development Lab, a center he co-founded with French economist Daniel Cohen and other colleagues. The lab is located at the Centre pour la recherche économique et ses applications Centre pour la recherche économique et ses applications (CEPREMAP) at the Paris School of Economics.

== Education ==
Diwan received a bachelor's degree in mathematics from the University of Paris-XII in 1977, a BA in Economics and Social Sciences from the University of Montreal in 1979 and a PhD in Economics and Finance from the University of California at Berkeley in 1985 under the direct supervision of the 1983 Nobel Prize Laureate in Economics Gerard Debreu. One of his professors at Berkeley was also the 2011 Nobel Laureate in Economics Joseph Eugene Stiglitz.

== Career ==
Diwan was assistant professor of Financial Economics at NYU's Stern Business School from 1984 until 1989 before joining the World Bank's Research Complex, International Economics Department (1988‐92).

He was Advisor to the Chief Economist of the Middle East and North Africa Region at the World Bank in 1992 and served as Deputy Manager (1994‐95) of the World Development Report: Workers in a Globalizing World. He served as Economist for the West Bank and Gaza in 1993‐94, then as Principal Economist (1995‐96) at the World Bank Institute. He then became World Bank Manager of the Economic Policy for Poverty Reduction Group from 1996 until 2002.

He became the World Bank Country Director for Ethiopia and Sudan from 2002 until 2007 and then for Ghana, Liberia, Sierra Leone, Burkina Faso, and Guinea from 2007 until 2011.

As World Bank Country Director he led several ambitious initiatives, such as Ethiopia's Productive Safety Net Programme (PSNP), Ethiopia's Protection of Basic Services Program and in West Africa, initiatives to support commercial agriculture, natural resources development, and jobs for the youth.

He taught Public Policy at Harvard Kennedy School and was Director for Africa and the Middle East at the Growth Lab of Harvard University's Center for International Development from 2011 until 2014. He also taught at Columbia University's School of International and Public Affairs from 2017 to 2018, and was Chair of the Socio-Economy of the Arab World at Paris Sciences et Lettres University (PSL).

Diwan has worked on conflict prevention and on state building in several war-torn countries including, Palestine, Sudan, Liberia, Sierra Leone, Yemen, and Guinea and has participated in the Sudan Comprehensive Peace Agreement, the Darfur Peace Negotiations, and the Oslo accords negotiations.

He helped found the Economic Research Forum, the leading network of economists in the Middle East and of a regional policy forum, the Mediterranean Development Forum.

== Awards ==
2024 International Economic Association Fellow Award

== Publications ==
Diwan has published widely on debt, developmental economics and international finance as well as cronyism and the political economy of the Middle East and North Africa region. Some of his publications include:

- Crony Capitalism in the Middle East: Business and Politics from Liberalization to the Arab Spring. Oxford: University Press, 2019. (co-edited with Adeel Malik and Izak Atiyas)
- The Middle East Economies in Times of Transition. Houndmills, Basingstoke, Hampshire ; New York, NY: Palgrave Macmillan, 2016. (co-edited with Ahmed Galal)
- A Political Economy of the Middle East. Fourth edition. Boulder, CO: Westview Press, a member of the Perseus Books Group, 2015. (with Melani Cammett, Alan Richards, and John Waterbury)
- A Political Economy of the Middle East. Third edition. Boulder, CO: Westview Press, a member of the Perseus Books Group, 2015. (with

Melani Cammett, Alan Richards, and John Waterbury)

- Understanding the Political Economy of the Arab Uprisings. Singapore ; New Jersey: World Scientific, 2014.
- Will Arab Workers Prosper or Be Left out in the Twenty-First Century? Regional Perspectives on World Development Report. Washington, D.C.: World Bank, 1995.
- Development under Adversity:The Palestinian Economy in Transition. Washington, DC: World Bank, 1999. (co-edited with Raḍwān ʻAlī Shaʻbān)
- Dealing with the Debt Crisis. A World Bank Symposium. Washington, DC: The World Bank, 1989. (with Ishrat Husain)
