= Felix Kübler =

German economist

- Born: December 13, 1969 (age 56); Bochum, Germany

Academic background
- Education: University of Bonn; Yale University

Academic work
- Discipline: Financial economics
- Institutions: University of Zurich; Swiss Finance Institute
- Website: Information at IDEAS / RePEc

Felix Kübler (born in Bochum on December 13, 1969) is a German economist who currently works as Professor of Financial Economics at the University of Zurich. His research interests include computational economics, general equilibrium theory and portfolio choice. In 2012, he was awarded the Gossen Prize in recognition of his contributions to economic research.

== Biography ==
A native of Bochum, Germany, Felix Kübler earned a Diplom from the University of Bonn in 1994, followed by a M.A. and a Ph.D. in economics from Yale University in 1995 and 1999. After his graduation, he became assistant professor at Stanford University (1999-2004) before moving to the University of Mannheim as professor of economics (2004–06). Following a brief position as associate professor of economics at the University of Pennsylvania (2006–08), Kübler has been working since 2008 as Professor of Financial Economics at the University of Zurich and as Senior Chair of the Swiss Finance Institute. He performs editorial duties for several academic reviews, including the Econometrica, Economic Theory, International Economic Review, Journal of Mathematical Economics, Operations Research, and Quantitative Economics. He also is a Fellow of the Econometric Society.

== Research ==
Felix Kübler's research focuses on computational economics and general equilibrium theory. According to IDEAS/RePEc, Kübler belongs to the top 4% of economists as ranked by research output. Key findings of his research include the following:

- The introduction of social security can Pareto-improve social welfare by sharing aggregate risks between generations, but the reform's crowding-out effect on capital tends to overturn these gains in welfare (with Dirk Krueger).
- A borrowing interest rate equal to the expected return on equity minimizes the demand for equity (with Steven J. Davis and Paul Willen).
- Competitive equilibria always exist in models with a single perishable consumption good and productive assets as the only collateral, and, assuming that all exogenous variables follow a Markov chain, there are also stationary equilibria, which can be characterized by a mapping from the exogenous shock and current distribution of financial wealth to prices and portfolio choices (with Karl Schmedders).
- Together with Dirk Krueger, Kübler has developed a method to compute equilibria in overlapping generations models with stochastic production based on Smolyak's algorithm.

== Selected publications ==
- Brown, D.J., Kübler, F. (2008). Computational Aspects of General Equilibrium Theory. Heidelberg: Springer-Verlag.
