= Mathematical Journal =

Mathematical Journal may refer to:

- Duke Mathematical Journal
- Tohoku Mathematical Journal

== See also ==
- Journal of Mathematical Physics
- Journal of Mathematical Economics
- Journal of the American Mathematical Society
