= Archen Minsol =

Archen Minsol is a composite pseudonym invented by Kenneth Arrow and used by Arrow, Hollis B. Chenery, Bagicha S. Minhas, and Robert M. Solow. Minsol was claimed to be at the university of Lower Slobbovia (a humorous reference to a fictional country mentioned in the cartoon strip Li'l Abner. The publication produced was: Minsol, A. (1968). Some Tests of the International Comparisons of Factor Efficiency with the CES Production Function: A Reply. The Review of Economics and Statistics, 477–479. The article was written in response to Gupta, S. B. (1968). Some tests of the international comparisons of factory efficiency with the CES production function. The Review of Economics and Statistics, 470–476. (1968).

One of the more interesting citations to the paper by Minsol is in US Justice Departments' Antitrust Division's comment on the Microsoft Tunney Act (Microsoft Tunney Act Comment : Project To Promote Competition & Innovation In The Digital Age (ProCOMP)).
