= Melani Cammett =

American political scientist

- Born: 1969 (age 56–57)
- Title: Clarence Dillon Professor of International Affairs

Academic background
- Education: Brown University; Tufts University; UC Berkeley

Academic work
- Institutions: Brown University; Watson Institute; Weatherhead Center for International Affairs; Harvard University

Melani Claire Cammett (born 1969) is an American political scientist; she is currently the Clarence Dillon Professor of International Affairs in the Department of Government at Harvard University and the Director of the university's Weatherhead Center for International Affairs. She holds a secondary appointment in the Department of Global Health and Population at the Harvard T.H. Chan School of Public Health. Cammett's research focuses on ethnoreligious violence and the politics of development, particularly in the Middle East.

== Education ==
Cammett received a Bachelor of Arts from Brown University in 1991. She completed a Master of Arts degree in International Relations at The Fletcher School at Tufts University in 1994. Cammett completed her doctoral work in political science at the University of California, Berkeley earning an M.A in 1996 and a Ph.D. in 2002.

== Career ==
Between 2002 and 2017, Cammett taught political economy and political science at Brown University. From 2012 to 2017, she was affiliated with the Watson Institute for International and Public Affairs as a faculty fellow. She served as Director of the Watson Institute's Middle East Studies Program between 2009 and 2012. In 2014, Cammett's book Compassionate Communalism: Welfare and Sectarianism in Lebanon was included on Marc Lynch's list of best Middle East political science books of 2014 published in The Washington Post.

In 2017, Cammett was appointed Clarence Dillon Professor of International Affairs at Harvard University. She has directed the university's Weatherhead Center for International Affairs since July 2021, when she succeeded Michèle Lamont. As of 2021, Cammett is a member of the advisory boards for the Center for Strategic and International Studies, Century International, and Princeton Institute for International and Regional Studies.

== Family ==
In recognition of her father John McKay Cammett's contributions to the development of John Jay College, with the rest of his family she established The John Cammett Social Change and Economic Justice Academic Award in his honor.

== Publications ==
- Globalization and Business Politics in Arab North Africa. Cambridge University Press. 2007. ISBN 9780521869508.
- The Political Economy of the Arab Uprisings. Westview Press. 2013. ISBN 9780813349442; with Ishac Diwan
- Compassionate Communalism: Welfare and Sectarianism in Lebanon. Cornell University Press. 2014. ISBN 9780801478932.
- The Politics of Non-State Social Welfare. Cornell University Press. 2014. ISBN 9780801479281.; edited with Lauren M. MacLean
- A Political Economy of the Middle East (4 ed.). Westview Press. 2015. ISBN 9780813349381; with Ishac Diwan, Alan Richards, and John Waterbury
- The Oxford Handbook of Politics in Muslim Societies. Oxford University Press. 2022. ISBN 9780190931056; edited with Pauline Jones.
