= Lionel W. McKenzie =

American economist (1919–2010)

- Born: January 26, 1919; Montezuma, Georgia, US
- Died: October 12, 2010 (aged 91)

Academic background
- Education: Duke University; University of Oxford; Princeton University
- Doctoral advisor: Oskar Morgenstern; William Baumol

Academic work
- Discipline: Economics
- Institutions: Duke University; University of Rochester
- Doctoral students: Michele Boldrin; Jerry Green; Tapan Mitra; Kazuo Nishimura; José Scheinkman; Nicholas C. Yannelis; Makoto Yano
- Website: Information at IDEAS / RePEc

Lionel Wilfred McKenzie (January 26, 1919 – October 12, 2010) was an American economist. He was the Wilson Professor Emeritus of Economics at the University of Rochester. He was born in Montezuma, Georgia. He completed undergraduate studies at Duke University in 1939 and subsequently moved to Oxford that year as a Rhodes Scholar. McKenzie worked with the Cowles Commission while it was in Chicago and served as an assistant professor at Duke from 1948 to 1957. Having received his Ph.D. at Princeton University in 1956, McKenzie moved to Rochester where he was responsible for the establishment of the graduate program in economics.

McKenzie has been the recipient of numerous professional awards, including the Guggenheim Fellowship in 1973, election to the United States National Academy of Sciences in 1978, the Order of the Rising Sun in 1995 and honorary doctorates from Keio University in 1998 and Kyoto University in 2004. The latter three reflect the success of his many Japanese students. McKenzie has been referred to as "the father of the mathematical economists in Japan".

== Work ==
His research focused on general equilibrium and capital theory. Although most widely known as a co-creator of the Arrow–Debreu–McKenzie model, he also published a book and numerous research papers, including:

- "On Equilibrium in Graham's Model of World Trade and Other Competitive Systems", Econometrica, 1954.
- "Demand Theory Without a Utility Index", The Review of Economic Studies, 1957.
- "On the Existence of General Equilibrium for a Competitive Economy", Econometrica, 1959.
- McKenzie, Lionel W. (1976). "Turnpike Theory". Econometrica. 44 (5): 841–865. doi:10.2307/1911532. ISSN 0012-9682. JSTOR 1911532., 1976
- "The Classical Theorem on Existence of Competitive Equilibrium", Econometrica, 1981.
- "Turnpike Theory, Discounted Utility, and the von Neumann Facet" Journal of Economic Theory, 1983.doi:10.1016/0022-0531(83)90111-4
- "General Equilibrium", The New Palgrave: A Dictionary of Economics, 1987, v. 2, pp. 498–512.
- "Turnpike Theory", The New Palgrave: A Dictionary of Economics, 1987, v. 4, pp. 712–20.
- Classical General Equilibrium Theory, The MIT Press, 2002.

The 1954 paper provided the first proof of the existence of a general equilibrium, using Kakutani's fixed point theorem. Another proof, by Kenneth Arrow and Gérard Debreu, was published in the next issue of the same journal.

The 1957 paper appears to include the first derivation of Shephard's lemma in the context of consumer theory.

In 2014, Till Düppe and E. Roy Weintraub published a book arguing that McKenzie was unfairly excluded from the Nobel Prizes which both Arrow and Debreu won for work on general equilibrium theory.

== Major publications ==
- McKenzie, Lionel (1960), "Matrices with dominant diagonals and economic theory", in Arrow, Kenneth J.; Karlin, Samuel; Suppes, Patrick (eds.), Mathematical models in the social sciences, 1959: Proceedings of the first Stanford symposium, Stanford mathematical studies in the social sciences, IV, Stanford, California: Stanford University Press, pp. 47–62, ISBN 9780804700214
- McKenzie, Lionel W. (2009). Equilibrium, Trade, and Growth: Selected Papers of Lionel W. McKenzie. MIT Press. ISBN 978-0-262-13501-6.
