= Africa Today =

- Discipline: African studies
- Language: English
- Edited by: Beth Samuelson, Barbaro Martinez-Ruiz, Sergio Fernandez, Maria Grosz-Ngaté, Lauren MacLean, Allison Martino, Esi Thompson, Carolyn Holmes, C. Kevin Taber (Book Review editor), and Alemayehu Fentaw Weldemariam (Managing Editor).

Publication details
- History: 1954–present
- Publisher: Indiana University Press (United States)
- Frequency: Quarterly

Standard abbreviations
- ISO 4: Afr. Today

Indexing
- ISSN: 0001-9887 (print); 1527-1978 (web)
- JSTOR: 00019887
- OCLC no.: 1058005254

Links
- Journal homepage; Journal page at Project MUSE; Africa Today on IU scholarworks

Africa Today is a peer-reviewed, interdisciplinary academic journal with articles about contemporary Africa. It was founded in 1954 and is published quarterly by the Indiana University Press. The editors accept submissions based on original research in any humanities and social science discipline. The journal publishes research articles, commentaries, and book reviews. Past special issues have focused on migration and social class, the future of African artistic practices, and family-based healthcare in Ghana. According to Project MUSE, it "publishes peer-reviewed, scholarly articles and book reviews in a broad range of academic disciplines on topics related to contemporary Africa" and "seek[s] to be a venue for interdisciplinary approaches, diverse perspectives and original research in the humanities and social sciences." It is indexed in CABI, EBSCOhost, Scopus, Gale, ProQuest, and Sage Publications, Inc., among other places.
