= Hahn's problem =

Problem in economics

Hahn's problem (or Hahn's question) refers to the theoretical challenge of building general equilibrium models where money does not enter preferences, yet has a positive equilibrium value. Money, since it is intrinsically worthless and is not demanded for its own sake, may not be made to enter the utility function and be present like any other good. The problem is named after the British economist Frank Hahn, who outlined it in his critique of Don Patinkin's placing money inside the utility function.
