= Jinkichi Tsukui =

Japanese economist

- Born: January 31, 1926; Tokyo
- Died: March 5, 2010 (aged 84)

Academic background
- Education: Hitotsubashi University PhD
- Academic advisor: Yuzo Yamada

Academic work
- Discipline: Theoretical economics
- Institutions: Osaka University

Jinkichji Tsukui (筑井 甚吉, Tsukui Jinkichi; January 31, 1926 – March 5, 2010) was a Japanese economist who was Professor of Economics at Osaka University from 1972 to 1989.

== Life and career ==
=== Education ===
Tsukui was born in Kichijoji, Tokyo, and graduated from Chuo University's Faculty of Economics with honors in 1956. (Note: His university entrance was delayed because his father wanted him to take over the family business.) In 1961, he completed his doctoral studies at Hitotsubashi University Graduate School of Economics. His supervisor was Yuzo Yamada.

=== From Tokyo to Osaka ===
After holding positions at Tokyo College of Economics and Seikei University, in 1972 he became a professor at Osaka University's Institute of Social and Economic Research. He served as the director of the institute from 1974 to 1975 and from 1982 to 1983. In 1989 he retired and became professor emeritus at Osaka University.

=== A fundamental structure of production ===
During his time as a visiting research associate at Harvard University (Harvard Economic Research Project directed by Wassily Leontief) from 1962 to 1964, he and David Simpson used an algorithm he developed to identify block triangularity (decomposability of input-output matrices) in the input-output tables of Japan, the United States, and Europe. They demonstrated the existence of a "fundamental structure of production" common to different economies. This paper has been widely cited in numerous studies worldwide. For example, it has been applied to methods for estimating the composition of products used in the field of industrial ecology, particularly in material flow analysis.

=== Turnpike theorem and its empirical application ===
In the field of economic growth theory, Tsukui is widely recognized for his contributions to the Turnpike theorem. While most studies on the Turnpike theorem are theoretical, Tsukui made a significant contribution by empirically applying the theorem using actual input-output data for Japan, marking the first endeavor of its kind. The resulting model was used by the Japanese government for planning purposes. In 1980, he was awarded the Nikkei Prize for Economic Books for his book on the Turnpike theorem and its application, coauthored with Yasusuke Murakami.

=== Miscellaneous ===
Tsukui loved sailing and, in 1951, even co-authored an article on the design of a sailboat with a naval architect before entering university.
