= Beth E. Allen =

American economist

Beth Elaine Allen
- Education: University of California, Berkeley
- Scientific career
- Fields: Economics
- Workplaces: University of Minnesota
- Doctoral advisor: Gérard Debreu

Beth Elaine Allen is an American professor of Economics at the University of Minnesota and has served as the Curtis L. Carlson Chair in that department. At the University of Minnesota, she teaches Advanced Game Theory and Advanced Topics in Economics. She graduated with a PhD from the University of California, Berkeley in 1978. She specializes in competition, economic theory, economic trends, economics of information and uncertainty, game theory, microeconomic theory, microeconomics, and price-setting. She is a Fellow of the Econometric Society and the Society for the Advancement of Economic Theory, and was one of very few women to have received tenure in a theoretical field of economics in a top university department by 1993. Her research focuses on the economics of information and uncertainty.

She was president of the Midwest Economics Association in 1999–2000.

== 2017 Charges ==
In 2017, she was charged with tax evasion by the State of Minnesota for failure to file income tax returns and pay the full amount of her state income taxes for several years. She owed around $50000 to the state in forms of unpaid tax and penalties. She pled guilty to these charges and was sentenced to two years of probation and a year of jail time. She has already paid $100000, and she was also required to pay the taxes she owned and $10917.65 in restitution to the state of Minnesota.She claimed that she failed to pay tax because of the lack of notices from MDOR; however, 19 letters from MDOR was found in her office and vehicle.

== Selected works ==
- Allen, Beth; Martin Hellwig (1986). "Bertrand-Edgeworth oligopoly in large markets". The Review of Economic Studies. 53 (2): 175–204. doi:10.2307/2297646. JSTOR 2297646.
- Allen, Beth (1981). "Generic existence of completely revealing equilibria for economies with uncertainty when prices convey information". Econometrica. 49 (5): 1173–1199. doi:10.2307/1912749. JSTOR 1912749.
- Allen, Beth (1990). "Information as an economic commodity". The American Economic Review. 80 (2): 268–273.
- Allen, Beth (1991). "Choosing R & D Projects: An Informational Approach." The American Economic Review . 81(2): 257–261.
- Allen, Beth. "The future of microeconomic theory." Journal of Economic Perspectives 14, no. 1 (2000): 143–150.
