= Arrow–Lind principle =

The Arrow–Lind principle (also Arrow–Lind theorem) states that under certain assumptions, the social cost of the risk moves to zero as the population tends to infinity, so that projects can be evaluated on the basis of expected net benefit alone.

== Assumptions ==
The theorem has three assumptions:

1. the government foots all costs initially and only when the benefits are being distributed should it attempt recovery through taxation
2. the return of the project must be independent of individual income. In case it is not, the risk premium ρ > 0 if they are positively correlated, and ρ < 0 if negatively correlated.
3. the returns must be spread out over a reasonably large number of individuals

Although the returns of public projects are usually very well spread out (highways, schools, hospitals et cetera) it is usually hard to justify the first assumption since the money is almost invariably taken out of the government's revenue stream and hence an individual's income.

The theorem has extensive ramifications in the fields of cost-benefit analysis, welfare economy, public administration and urban planning, macro-economics and such. The most direct impact is on costing of public sector projects where the theorem justifies using a riskless discount rate when considering expected returns.

The theorem was first given by Kenneth Arrow, winner of the Sveriges Riksbank Prize in Economic Sciences in Memory of Alfred Nobel in 1972, and Robert Lind in 1970.

== See also ==
- K. J. Arrow and R. C. Lind, "Uncertainty and the Evaluation of Public Investment Decisions," Amer. Econ. Rev., June 1970, 60, 364-78.
- Jean-Jacques Laffont, The economics of uncertainty and information, Edition: 3, Published by MIT Press, 1989, ISBN 0-262-12136-0
- Per-Olov Johansson, An introduction to modern welfare economics, Published by Cambridge University Press, 1991, ISBN 0-521-35695-4
- Robert J. Brent, Applied Cost-benefit Analysis, 2nd Edition, Edward Elgar Publishing, 2006, ISBN 1-84376-891-7
- Foldes, L P & Rees, R, A Note on the Arrow-Lind Theorem, American Economic Review, American Economic Association, vol. 67(2), 1977
- Richard W. Tresch, Public Finance: A Normative Theory, 2nd Edition, Academic Press, 2002, ISBN 0-12-699051-4
- Gardner, Roy (1 January 1979). "The Arrow-Lind Theorem in a Continuum Economy". The American Economic Review. 69 (3): 420–422. JSTOR 1807375.
- Dinwiddy, Caroline L.; Teal, Francis J. (26 January 1996). Principles of Cost-Benefit Analysis for Developing Countries. Cambridge University Press. ISBN 9780521479165.
