= Economic Theory =

- Discipline: Economics
- Language: English
- Edited by: Nicholas C. Yannelis

Publication details
- History: 1991–present
- Publisher: Springer
- Frequency: Monthly
- Impact factor: 1.137 (2015)

Standard abbreviations
- ISO 4: Econ. Theory
- MathSciNet: Econom. Theory

Indexing
- CODEN: ECTHEA
- ISSN: 0938-2259

Links
- Journal homepage

Economic Theory is a peer-reviewed academic journal that focuses on theoretical economics, particularly social choice, general equilibrium theory, and game theory. Mathematically rigorous articles are also published in the fields of experimental economics, public economics, international economics, development economics, and industrial organisation.

Economic Theory is the official journal of the Society for the Advancement of Economic Theory. The journal was founded by Charalambos D. Aliprantis and the society was founded by Charalambos D. Aliprantis, Edward C. Prescott, and Nicholas C. Yannelis.

In 2013, Economic Theory removed the section of the paper for short papers/notes. As a substitute, the Society for the Advancement of Economic Theory established Economic Theory Bulletin, a sister journal to Economic Theory focused on short papers in theoretical economics.
