= Society for the Advancement of Economic Theory =

Academic society and publisher

The Society for the Advancement of Economic Theory abbreviated as SAET is a non-profit membership society founded to "advance knowledge in theoretical economics and to facilitate communication among researchers in economics, mathematics, game theory, or any other field which is potentially useful to economic theory." Membership includes economists, mathematicians, game theorists, and other individuals with interests in economics based on rigorous theoretical reasoning.

== History ==
The society was founded in 1991 by Charalambos D. Aliprantis, Edward C. Prescott, and Nicholas C. Yannelis. It holds several events every year.

== Academic Journals ==
The Society is responsible for the publication of the peer-reviewed journal Economic Theory, the first edition of which was published in March 1991.

The society also publishes the journal Economic Theory Bulletin, which specializes in shorter papers.

== Conferences ==
The society holds annual conferences that attract a large number of academic economists. The inaugural conference in 1993 was held in the Greek island of Cephalonia. In recent years annual conferences have alternated between European and Asian/South American locations.

== Fellows ==
Economic Theory Fellows in the Society for the Advancement of Economic Theory are elected by the Society's Fellowship Committee for their scientific excellence, originality, and leadership; high ethical standards; and scholarly and creative achievement. The Fellowship Committee includes a nomination subcommittee which is elected by fellows. Foundation Fellows were selected in 2011, and new Fellows have been elected annually from 2012.

== Past Presidents ==
You can visit the SAET webpage for a list of past Presidents.

== Current Board ==
You can visit the SAET webpage to find the current board.
