= Moving equilibrium theorem =

Consider a dynamical system

(1)..........$\dot{x}=f(x,y)$

(2)..........$\qquad \dot{y}=g(x,y)$

with the state variables $x$ and $y$. Assume that $x$ is fast and $y$ is slow. Assume that the system (1) gives, for any fixed $y$, an asymptotically stable solution $\bar{x}(y)$. Substituting this for $x$ in (2) yields

(3)..........$\qquad \dot{Y}=g(\bar{x}(Y),Y)=:G(Y).$

Here $y$ has been replaced by $Y$ to indicate that the solution $Y$ to (3) differs from the solution for $y$ obtainable from the system (1), (2).

The Moving Equilibrium Theorem suggested by Lotka states that the solutions $Y$ obtainable from (3) approximate the solutions $y$ obtainable from (1), (2) provided the partial system (1) is asymptotically stable in $x$ for any given $y$ and heavily damped (fast).

The theorem has been proved for linear systems comprising real vectors $x$ and $y$. It permits reducing high-dimensional dynamical problems to lower dimensions and underlies Alfred Marshall's temporary equilibrium method.
