= Frank Hahn =

British economist (1925–2013)

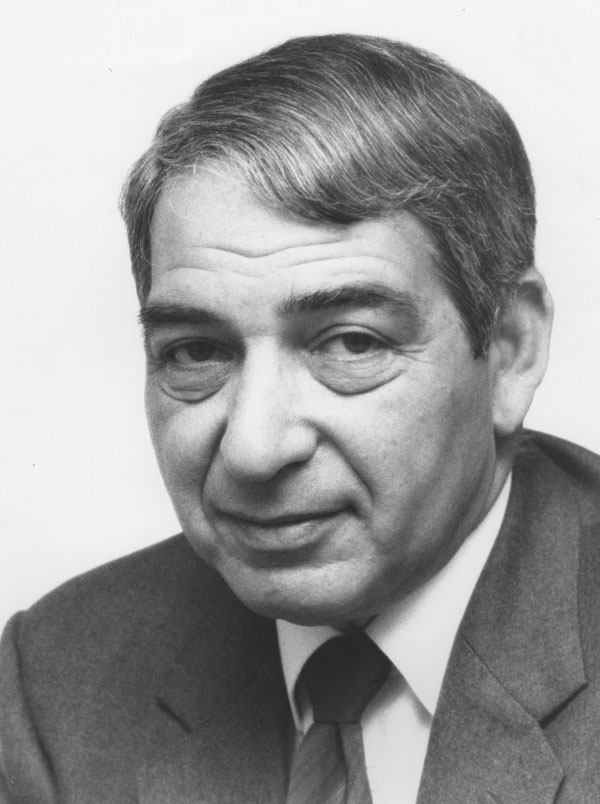
- Born: 26 April 1925; Berlin, Germany
- Died: 29 January 2013 (aged 87); Cambridge, England

Academic background
- Education: London School of Economics
- Doctoral advisor: Nicholas Kaldor; Lionel Robbins

Academic work
- Discipline: Economics
- Institutions: University of Birmingham; Cambridge University; London School of Economics
- Doctoral students: Christopher Bliss; Douglas Gale; Edwin Mills (economist); James Mirrlees; David Newbery; Stephen Nickell; Subroto Roy (economist); Anthony Shorrocks
- Notable ideas: General equilibrium theory, critique of monetarism, monetary theory, Keynesian economics, Non-Walrasian economics, "Hahn's problem", Stability of general equilibrium
- Website: Information at IDEAS / RePEc

Frank Horace Hahn FBA (26 April 1925 – 29 January 2013) was a British economist whose work focused on general equilibrium theory, monetary theory, Keynesian economics and critique of monetarism. A famous problem of economic theory, the conditions under which money, which is intrinsically worthless, can have a positive value in a general equilibrium, is called "Hahn's problem" after him. One of Hahn's main abiding concerns was the understanding of Keynesian (Non-Walrasian) outcomes in general equilibrium situations.

== Biography ==
=== Early life and education ===
Frank Hahn was born on 26 April 1925 in Berlin to Arnold and Maria Hahn, their roots in German and Czech speaking Jewish communities respectively. Arnold Hahn was a chemist by profession and a writer. Arnold and Maria Hahn with their two sons, Peter and Frank, moved to Prague in 1931 (or possibly 1934) and left for England in 1938.

Frank's older brother was Peter Hahn (8 November 1923 – 28 August 2007) who became an eminent Czech research physiologist who had returned to Czechoslovakia after the War but was compelled to flee to Canada after the Prague Spring in 1968 in which he was active.

Peter and Frank were educated at Bournemouth School from when they were 15, 13 respectively, a school for which Frank retained an abiding enthusiasm. Peter started at Swansea University but joined the Czechoslovak squadron of the RAF during the War. Frank too became a navigator in the RAF in the Second World War, then resumed his interrupted higher education, not reading Mathematics at Balliol College, Oxford, but instead reading Economics at the London School of Economics (LSE). He met at LSE and in 1946 married Dorothy Salter, also an economist and secretary to F. A. Hayek. Frank started his teaching career with a lectureship at Birmingham in 1948.

Frank Hahn took his doctoral degree in 1951 at the LSE for the thesis The share of wages: an enquiry into the theory of distribution, where he was supervised initially by Nicholas Kaldor and later by Lionel Robbins. As a student, he had been part of the Hayek–Robbins seminar at LSE, and he once said his wife had been an original member of the Mont Pelerin Society.

=== Academia ===
Hahn began his teaching career in 1948 at the University of Birmingham, where he was subsequently elected Reader in Mathematical Economics. In 1960 he joined the University of Cambridge—as a Fellow of the new Churchill College and as University Lecturer in Economics.

In 1967 he was appointed Professor at the London School of Economics (though he apparently continued to reside in Cambridge). Five years later he left the LSE appointment to become Professor at Cambridge. His inaugural lecture at Cambridge "On the notion of equilibrium in economics" was delivered on 28 February 1973. He remained Professor of Economics at Cambridge until his retirement in 1992, though he made near-annual visits to the US, especially as visiting professor at Harvard University, the MIT, and the University of California, Berkeley, as well as to Stanford's Institute of Mathematical Studies in the Social Sciences. From 1990 to 1996 Hahn directed the PhD program of the Economics Department at the University of Siena. He eventually became emeritus professor at Cambridge.

=== Famous letter ===
He gained widespread recognition and attention in 1981 as the co-instigator of a letter to The Times signed by 364 of Britain's best-known economists, questioning Margaret Thatcher's economic policy, with a warning that it would only result in deepening the prevailing depression.

=== Influence and leanings ===
Frank Hahn, by his own admission, was influenced in economics by John Hicks, W. M. Gorman, Takashi Negishi and Kenneth Arrow among others. He in turn influenced a large number of colleagues and students.

== Death ==
He died in Cambridge on 29 January 2013, following a short illness. He is survived by his wife Dorothy, née Salter, whom he had married in 1946.

== Major works ==
- "The Share of Wages in the Trade Cycle", Economic Journal, vol 60 (1950).
- "The Share of Wages in National Income", Oxford Economic Papers vol. 3 No. 2 (1951).
- "The Rate of Interest in General Equilibrium Analysis", Economic Journal (1955).
- "Gross Substitutes and the Dynamic Stability of General Equilibrium", Econometrica vol 26 (1958) pp. 169–70.
- "The Patinkin Controversy", Review of Economic Studies vol. 19 (1960).
- "The Stability of Growth Equilibrium", Quarterly Journal of Economics vol. 74, pp. 206–26 (1960).
- "Money, Dynamic Stability and Growth", Metroeconomica vol. 13 No. 11 (August 1961).
- "A Stable Adjustment Process for a Competitive Economy", Review of Economic Studies vol 39 pp. 62–5 (1962).
- "A Theorem on Non-Tatonnement Stability" with T.Negishi, Econometrica vol. 30 No. 3 (1962).
- "On the Stability of a Pure Exchange Equilibrium", International Economic Review, vol. 3 (May 1962), 206–13.
- "The Stability of the Cournot Oligopoly Solution", Review of Economic Studies vol. 29 pp. 329–33 (1962).
- "On the Disequilibrium Behavior of a Multi-Sectoral Growth Model", Economic Journal (1963)
- "The Theory of Economic Growth: A survey", with R.C.O.Matthews (1964), Economic Journal vol 74 pp. 779–902 (1964).JSTOR 2228848
- "On Some Problems of Proving the Existence of an Equilibrium in a Monetary Economy" in Theory of Interest Rates (1965), edited by Hahn and Brechling.
- "Equilibrium Dynamics with Heterogeneous Capital Goods" Quarterly Journal of Economics vol. 80 (1966) pp. 633–46.
- "On Warranted Growth Paths", Review of Economic Studies, vol. 35, pp. 175–84 (1968).
- "On Money and Growth", Journal of Money, Credit and Banking vol. 1 No. 2 (1969).
- "Some Adjustment Problems", Econometrica vol. 38 No. 1 (January 1970).
- General Competitive Analysis (1971), with K.J. Arrow.
- "Equilibrium with Transactions Costs", Econometrica vol. 39 No. 3 (1971).
- "The Winter of Our Discontent", Economica (1973).
- "On Some Equilibrium Growth Paths" in Models of Economic Growth (1973), edited by Mirrlees and Stern.
- "On Transactions Costs, Inessential Sequence Economics and Money", Review of Economic Studies vol. 40 No. 4 (October 1973).
- On the Notion of Equilibrium in Economics (1974).
- "Revival of Political Economy: The wrong issues and the wrong arguments", Economic Record vol. 51 pp. 360–4 (1975).
- "Keynesian Economics and General Equilibrium Theory: Reflections on some current debates" in Microeconomic Foundations of Macroeconomics (1977), edited by Harcourt.
- "Monetarism and Economic Theory", Economica Vol. 47 #185 (1980).
- "General Equilibrium Theory" in Crisis in Economic Theory (1981) edited by Bell and Kristol.
- Money and Inflation (1982).
- "Reflections on the Invisible Hand", Lloyd's Bank Review, April 1982.
- "The Neo-Ricardians", Cambridge Journal of Economics (1982).
- "Stability" in Handbook of Mathematical Economics (1982), edited by Arrow and Intriligator.
- "On some difficulties of the utilitarian economist" in Sen, Amartya; Williams, Bernard, eds. (1982). Utilitarianism and beyond. Cambridge: Cambridge University Press. pp. 187–198. ISBN 9780511611964.
- Equilibrium and Macroeconomics (1984).
- Money, Growth and Stability (1985).
- "Liquidity" in Handbook of Monetary Economics (1988), edited by Friedman and Hahn.
- Critical Essay on Modern Macroeconomic Theory (1995) with R. M. Solow.
- "A Remark on Incomplete Market Equilibrium" in Markets, Information and Uncertainty (1999), edited by Chichilnisky.
- "Notes on Sequence Economies, Transaction Costs and Uncertainty", with K.J. Arrow Journal of Economic Theory vol. 86 No. 2 (1999).
