= Jan Kmenta =

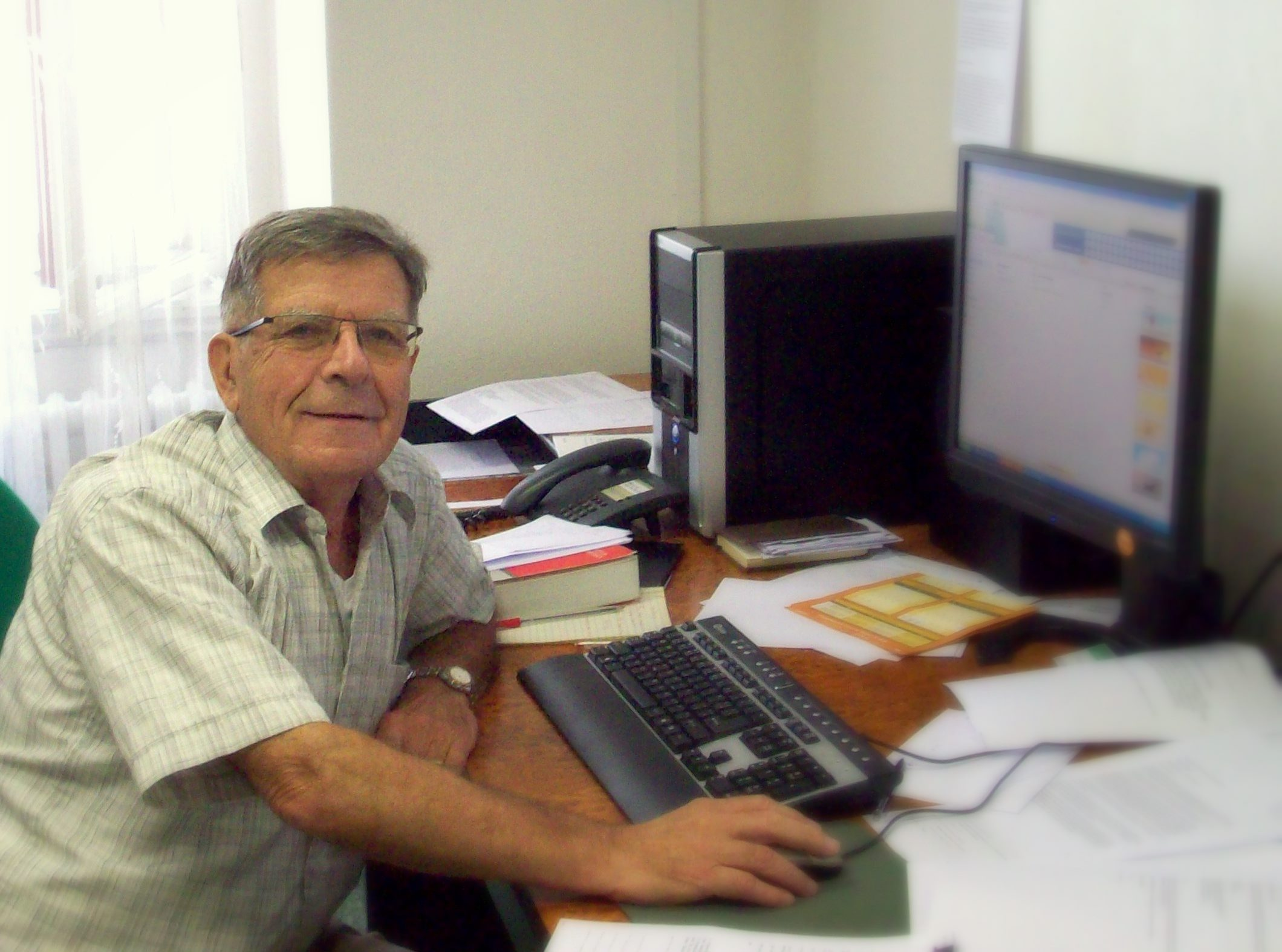
- Kmenta at his CERGE-EI office
- Born: January 3, 1928; Prague, Czechoslovakia
- Died: July 24, 2016 (aged 88); Prague, Czech Republic

Academic background
- Education: Stanford University (Ph.D.); University of Sydney (B.Sc.)
- Doctoral advisor: Kenneth Arrow
- Influences: Arthur Goldberger

Academic work
- Discipline: Econometrics
- School or tradition: Neoclassical economics
- Institutions: University of Michigan
- Awards: Alexander von Humboldt Foundation Award; Neuron award for lifetime achievements
- Website: Information at IDEAS / RePEc

Jan Kmenta (January 3, 1928 – July 24, 2016) was a Czech-American economist. He was the Professor Emeritus of Economics and Statistics at the University of Michigan and Visiting Professor at CERGE-EI in Prague, until summer 2016.

== Academic positions and awards ==
After earning his PhD in Economics with a minor in Statistics from Stanford under Kenneth Arrow in 1964, Kmenta held academic positions at the University of Wisconsin 1964–65, Michigan State University 1965–73, and the University of Michigan 1973-93 (emeritus 1993-2016) and was a visiting faculty member at universities in five countries. Kmenta received 24 academic honors, awards, and prizes during his career, beginning with being made a fellow of the American Statistical Association in 1970 and a fellow of the Econometric Society in 1980, and stretching through 2010 when he received the NEURON Award for Lifetime Achievement in Economics.

== Econometric work ==
Kmenta wrote extensively on econometric model building as well as econometric methods. He edited two books with James B. Ramsey: Evaluation of Econometric Models and Large Scale Macro-Econometric Models: Theory and Practice and is the author of at least 34 published econometrics papers. A wide-ranging econometrician, his papers analyze topics as disparate as small sample properties of estimators, missing observations, estimation of production function parameters, and ridge regression among many others. Much of his published research is focused on econometric issues that are relevant in areas far beyond economics. As a result, his work is referenced in publications in medicine, political science, insurance underwriting, antitrust litigation, and energy issues, to list but a few. For example, the early (1966) "Specification and Estimation of Cobb-Douglas Production Function Models" with Arnold Zellner and Jacques Drèze has been cited by research as different as family involvement effects on firm productivity and devising fishing gears with reduced environmental effects. Kmenta's "General Procedure for Obtaining Maximum Likelihood Estimates in Generalized Regression Models" (with W. Oberhofer) formally established conditions for validity of the iterative estimation method most widely used in econometrics today, while his simplified estimation of the constant elasticity of substitution constant elasticity of substitution production function both gave "the nascent field of industrial organization a new set of powerful tools for studying firm efficiency" and has been used to analyze the cost of network infrastructure, among many other applications. Kmenta has made multiple other contributions incorporated into the core of econometrics.

=== Elements of Econometrics ===
Jan Kmenta is best known to the general economics profession around the world for his internationally acclaimed textbook, Elements of Econometrics (titled after Euclid's Elements) which was first published in 1971 and extensively revised in a 1986 second edition. Having been published in Spanish, Portuguese, Persian, and Croatian over the years, it is still available in English today. Initially econometrics was centered on providing essentially standalone solutions to particular problems e.g., a useful analytically and econometrically tractable production function such as the Cobb-Douglas, a formal development of the computationally expedient iterative estimation procedure, and a simple way to estimate the parameters of a mathematically complex function (to characterize the Cobb-Douglas, generalized regression, and CES publication examples cited above). As econometrics matured from a collection of clever solutions for specific problems into its own major field of research, econometricians worked to integrate what was known into a systematic whole greater than the sum of its parts. In addition to listing what might be called well-solved problems, they made explicit the implied assumptions underlying them, what can be said if the assumptions are not logically valid, and how to obtain useful results in these cases. With his focus on econometrics and a strong background in mathematics and statistics Kmenta was a major contributor to this effort. The book embodies the essence of Kmenta's approach to both econometrics and statistics which is perhaps best – if informally—characterized as "It's all very easy once you really understand it – don't bother memorizing anything, just do the algebra and think about what you are doing and why. Keep things as simple as possible."

== Early life ==
Kmenta was enrolled as student of statistics at the Czech Technical University in Prague in 1948. He left the university in September 1949 following the 1948 communist coup in Czechoslovakia, escaping to West Germany where he lived in refugee camps for more than a year. He then emigrated to Australia in December 1950 under its two-year 'indentured labor' immigration policy. Kmenta was assigned to breaking rocks in a stone quarry in Picton (near Sydney). Later, he went to Sydney and met a professor at the Technical College in Ultimo who tested Kmenta's statistics training and immediately hired him to do statistical calculations. However, an employment officer in Sydney prevented the hiring due to his status as an immigrant and instead assigned him to a metal-stamping plant in Balmain. Kmenta learned English by listening to the radio and through newspapers with an English/Czech dictionary. He later obtained a job emptying and steam-boiling bed pans in a tuberculosis hospital in Randwick. At this time, Sydney University was offering evening courses for servicemen in which Kmenta enrolled, joining other Czechs taking classes while working day jobs. Professor Charles Birch helped advise them regarding administrative procedures for admission to the university and similar matters.

Kmenta received his Bachelor of Economics degree with a minor in Statistics with First Class Honors from the University of Sydney in 1955. He won a Fulbright Scholarship and moved to the United States, obtaining a Ph.D. in Economics from Stanford University in 1964. At Stanford he was influenced by notable professors including Kenneth Arrow and Arthur Goldberger who were developing a rigorous approach to economics and econometrics.

== Personal life ==
He was married to award-winning Australian filmmaker Barbara Chobocky.

Kmenta died on July 24, 2016.

== Selected works ==
- Zellner, Arnold; Kmenta, Jan; Drèze, Jacques (1966). "Specification and Estimation of Cobb–Douglas Production Function Models". Econometrica 34 (4): 784–795. JSTOR 1910099.
- Kmenta, Jan (1967). “On Estimation of the CES Production Function” International Economic Review 8 (2) available on http://deepblue.lib.umich.edu/bitstream/handle/2027.42/91902/Kmenta-Estimation_CES_Production_Function.pdf?sequence=1
- Kmenta, J.; Gilbert, R (1968). “Small Sample Properties of Alternative Estimators of Seemingly Unrelated Regressions” Journal of the American Statistical Association 1180-1200.
- Kmenta, J.; Gilbert, R (1970). “Estimation of Seemingly Unrelated Regressions with Autoregressive Disturbances, Journal of the American Statistical Association 186-197.
- Kmenta, J. (1971, revised ed. 1986). Elements of Econometrics. New York: Macmillan. (Original edition also available in Spanish, Portuguese, Persian, and Croatian)
- Kmenta, J.: Kreinin, M.E., Ramsey, J.B. (1971). “Factor Substitution and Effective Protection Reconsidered” American Economic Review 61: 891-900.
- Kmenta, J.; Oberhofer, W. (1973). “Estimation of Standard Errors of the Characteristic Roods of Dynamic Econometric Models” Econometrica 41: 171-177.
- Kmenta, J.; Smith, P.E. (1973). “Autonomous Expenditures versus Money Supply: An Application of Dynamic Multipliers” Review of Economics and Statistics 55: 229-307.
- Kmenta, Jan; Oberhofer, W. (1974)“General Procedure for Obtaining Maximum Likelihood Estimates in Generalized Regression Models” Econometrica 42: 572-590 available on http://deepblue.lib.umich.edu/handle/2027.42/91915
- Kmenta, J.; Benus, J.; Shapiro, H. (1976). “The Dynamics of Household Budget Allocation to Food Expenditures” Review of Economics and Statistics 58: 129-138.
- Kmenta, J.; Ramsey, James B., eds. (1981). Large-Scale Macro-Econometric Models: Theory and Practice. New York: North-Holland. ISBN 0-444-86295-1.
- Kmenta, Jan, Lin, Karl (1982). “Ridge Regression Under Alternative Loss Criteria” Review of Economics and Statistics 64: 488-494.
- Kmenta, Jan, Doran, H. E. (1986). “A Lack-of-fit Test for Econometric Applications to Cross-section Data” Review of Economics and Statistics 68: 346-350.
- Kmenta, J., Marikova, E.M. (1987). “On the Similarity of Macro-Econometric Models of Market and Planned Economies: The First Models of Czechoslovakia” Comparative Economic Studies 29.
- Keener, Robert W.; Kmenta, Jan; Weber, Neville C. (1991). "Estimation of the Covariance Matrix of the Least-Squares Regression Coefficients When the Disturbance Covariance Matrix Is of Unknown Form" Econometric Theory7 (1): 22–45. doi:10.1017/S0266466600004229.
- Kmenta, J., interviewed by Lodewijks, J. (2005). “The ET Interview: Professor Jan Kmenta” Econometric Theory 21: 621-664.
- Kmenta, J. (2010). “Econometrics: A Failed Science?” International Encyclopedia of Statistical Science Springer Verlag.
