= Ronald W. Jones =

American economist (1931–2022)

- Born: Ronald Winthrop Jones; July 5, 1931; Louisville, Kentucky, U.S.
- Died: September 27, 2022 (aged 91)
- Education: MIT
- Scientific career
- Fields: Economics
- Workplaces: University of Rochester
- Doctoral advisor: Robert Solow
- Doctoral students: Eric Bond; Makoto Yano

Ronald Winthrop Jones (July 5, 1931 – September 27, 2022) was an influential international trade economist and retired Xerox Professor of Economics at the University of Rochester. His highly acclaimed book Globalization and the Theory of Input Trade summarizes much of his past work and also discusses the recent market trend toward fragmentation and outsourcing of the production process.

Professor Jones also is an author of World Trade and Payments(with Richard E. Caves and Jeffrey Frankel), an upper-level college textbook that focuses on international economics.

He earned an A.B. from Swarthmore College in 1952 and a Ph.D. from the Massachusetts Institute of Technology in 1956.

== See also ==
- Neary, J. Peter; Helpman, Elhanan; Ethier, Wilfred (1993). Theory, policy and dynamics in international trade: essays in honor of Ronald W Jones. Cambridge New York, NY, USA: Cambridge University Press. ISBN 9780521434423.
