= Partial equilibrium =

Concept in economics

In economics, partial equilibrium is a condition of economic equilibrium which analyzes only a single market, ceteris paribus (everything else remaining constant) except for the one change at a time being analyzed. In general equilibrium analysis, on the other hand, the prices and quantities of all markets in the economy are considered simultaneously, including feedback effects from one to another, though the assumption of ceteris paribus is maintained with respect to such things as constancy of tastes and technology.

Mas-Colell, Whinston & Green's widely used graduate textbook says, "Partial equilibrium models of markets, or of systems of related markets, determine prices, profits, productions, and the other variables of interest adhering to the assumption that there are no feedback effects from these endogenous magnitudes to the underlying demand or cost curves that are specified in advance." General equilibrium analysis, in contrast, begins with tastes, endowments, and technology being fixed, but takes into account feedback effects between the prices and quantities of all goods in the economy.

The supply and demand model originated by Alfred Marshall is the paradigmatic example of a partial equilibrium model. The clearance of the market for some specific goods is obtained independently from prices and quantities in other markets. In other words, the prices of all substitute goods and complement goods, as well as income levels of consumers, are taken as given. This makes analysis much simpler than in a general equilibrium model, which includes an entire economy.

Consider, for example, the effect of a tariff on imported French wine. Partial equilibrium would look at just that market, and show that the price would rise. It would ignore the fact that if French wine became more expensive, demand for domestic wine would rise, pushing up the price of domestic wine, which would feed back into the market for French wine. If the feedback were included, the higher domestic price would shift out the demand curve for French wine, further increasing its price. This further increase would again raise demand for domestic wine, and the feedback would increase, resulting in an infinite cycle that would eventually dampen out and converge. The importance of these feedback effects might or might not be worth the extra calculations necessary. They will generally affect the exact amount of the original good's price change, but not the direction.

Partial equilibrium analysis examines the effects of policy action only for one good at a time. Thus, it might look at the effect of a price ceiling for luxury automobiles without looking at the effect of that automobile price ceiling on the demand for bicycles, which would be analyzed separately.

Partial equilibrium applies not just to perfectly competitive markets, but to monopolistic competition, oligopoly, monopoly and monopsony.

== See also ==
- Computable general equilibrium
- Cost curve
- General equilibrium theory
- Law of one price
