= Turnpike theory =

Economic theory

Turnpike theory refers to a set of economic theories about the optimal path of accumulation (often capital accumulation) in a system, depending on the initial and final levels. In the context of a macroeconomic exogenous growth model, for example, it says that if an infinite optimal path is calculated, and an economic planner wishes to move an economy from one level of capital to another, as long as the planner has sufficient time, the most efficient path is to quickly move the level of capital stock to a level close to the infinite optimal path, and to allow capital to develop along that path until it is nearly the end of the desired term and the planner must move the capital stock to the desired final level. The name of the theory refers to the idea that a turnpike is the fastest route between two points which are far apart, even if it is not the most direct route.

== Origins ==
Although the idea can be traced back to John von Neumann in 1945, Lionel W. McKenzie traces the term to Robert Dorfman, Paul Samuelson, and Robert Solow's Linear Programming and Economic Analysis in 1958, referring to an American English word for a Highway:

Thus in this unexpected way, we have found a real normative significance for steady growth—not steady growth in general, but maximal von Neumann growth. It is, in a sense, the single most effective way for the system to grow, so that if we are planning long-run growth, no matter where we start, and where we desire to end up, it will pay in the intermediate stages to get into a growth phase of this kind. It is exactly like a turnpike paralleled by a network of minor roads. There is a fastest route between any two points; and if the origin and destination are close together and far from the turnpike, the best route may not touch the turnpike. But if the origin and destination are far enough apart, it will always pay to get on to the turnpike and cover distance at the best rate of travel, even if this means adding a little mileage at either end. The best intermediate capital configuration is one which will grow most rapidly, even if it is not the desired one, it is temporarily optimal.

The theorem was subsequently proved for various versions.

== Variations ==
McKenzie in 1976 published a review of the idea up to that point. He saw three general variations of turnpike theories.

- In a system with a set initial and terminal capital stock where the objective of the economic planner is to maximize the sum of utilities over the finite accumulation period, then so long as the accumulation period is long enough, most of the optimal path will be within some small neighborhood of an infinite path that is optimal. This often implies that
  - If a finite optimal path starts on (or near) the infinite path, it hugs that path for most of the time, regardless of the desired capital stock at the end.
  - The theorem also generalizes for infinite paths, where the basic result is that optimal paths converge to each other, regardless of initial capital stocks.

== Applications ==
The theorem has many applications in optimal control and in a general equilibrium context. In general equilibrium, the variation which involves infinite capital accumulation paths can be applied. In a system with many infinitely lived agents with the same (small) discount rates on the future, regardless of initial endowments, the equilibrium allocations of all agents converge.

Although studies on the turnpike theorem are mostly theoretical, Jinkichi Tsukui's work is a notable exception. He empirically implemented the theorem using actual input-output data for Japan, and the resulting model was used for planning purposes by the Japanese government.
