= Kenneth Arrow =

American economist (1921–2017)

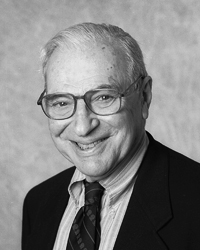
- Arrow in 1996
- Born: Kenneth Joseph Arrow; August 23, 1921; New York City, U.S.
- Died: February 21, 2017 (aged 95); Palo Alto, California, U.S.

Academic background
- Education: City College of New York (BS); Columbia University (MS, PhD)
- Doctoral advisor: Harold Hotelling
- Influences: Alfred Tarski

Academic work
- Discipline: Microeconomics; General equilibrium theory; Social choice theory
- School or tradition: Neoclassical economics
- Institutions: Stanford University; University of Chicago; Harvard University
- Doctoral students: David F. Bradford; Michael Bruno; John Geanakoplos; Joshua Gans; Nancy Gordon; Michael Schwarz; Gillian Hadfield; John Harsanyi; Jan Kmenta; Timur Kuran; Jean-Jacques Laffont; Eric Maskin; Roger Myerson; Sebastián Piñera; Andrea Prat; Karl Shell; Michael Spence; Nancy Stokey; Menahem Yaari
- Notable ideas: General equilibrium theory; Fundamental theorems of welfare economics; Arrow's impossibility theorem; Endogenous growth theory
- Awards: John Bates Clark Medal (1957); Nobel Prize in Economics (1972); von Neumann Theory Prize (1986); National Medal of Science (2004); ForMemRS (2006)
- Website: Information at IDEAS / RePEc

Kenneth Joseph Arrow (August 23, 1921 – February 21, 2017) was an American economist, mathematician and political theorist. He received the John Bates Clark Medal in 1957, and the Nobel Memorial Prize in Economic Sciences in 1972, along with John Hicks.

In economics, Arrow was a major figure in postwar neoclassical economic theory. Four of his students (Roger Myerson, Eric Maskin, John Harsanyi, and Michael Spence) went on to become Nobel laureates themselves. His contributions to social choice theory, notably his "impossibility theorem", and his work on general equilibrium analysis are significant. His work in many other areas of economics, including endogenous growth theory and the economics of information, was also foundational.

== Education and early career ==
Arrow was born on August 23, 1921, in New York City. Arrow's mother, Lilian (Greenberg), was from Iași, Romania, and his father, Harry Arrow, was from nearby Podu Iloaiei. The family was of Romanian-Jewish descent, and very supportive of Kenneth's education. Growing up during the Great Depression, he embraced socialism in his youth. He would later move away from socialism, but his views retained a left-leaning philosophy.

He graduated from Townsend Harris High School and then earned a bachelor's degree in mathematics from the City College of New York in 1940, where he was a member of Sigma Phi Epsilon. He then attended Columbia University for graduate studies, obtaining a master's degree in mathematics in June 1941. At Columbia, Arrow studied under Harold Hotelling, who influenced him to switch fields to economics. He served as a weather officer in the United States Army Air Forces from 1942 to 1946.

== Academic career ==
From 1946 to 1949, Arrow was a graduate student at Columbia University, and also worked as a research associate at the Cowles Commission. During that time he also was an assistant professor of economics at the University of Chicago and worked at the RAND Corporation in California. He left the University of Chicago to become an acting assistant professor of economics and statistics at Stanford University. In 1951, he received a PhD degree from Columbia University. He served in the government on the staff of the Council of Economic Advisers in the 1960s with Robert Solow. In 1968, he left Stanford for Harvard University, where he was appointed Professor of Economics; it was during his tenure there that he received the Nobel Prize in Economics.

Arrow returned to Stanford University in 1979 and became the Joan Kenney Professor of Economics and Professor of Operations Research. He retired in 1991. As a Fulbright Distinguished Chair, in 1995 he taught economics at the University of Siena. He was also a founding member of the Pontifical Academy of Social Sciences and a member of the board at the Santa Fe Institute. At various stages in his career he was a Fellow of Churchill College, Cambridge. He was one of the founding editors of the Annual Review of Economics, which was first published in 2009.

Four of his former students have gone on to become Nobel Prize winners, namely John Harsanyi, Eric Maskin, Roger Myerson, and Michael Spence. A collection of Arrow's papers is housed at the Rubenstein Library at Duke University.

=== Arrow's impossibility theorem ===
Arrow's monograph Social Choice and Individual Values derives from his 1951 PhD thesis.

If we exclude the possibility of interpersonal comparisons of utility, then the only methods of passing from individual tastes to social preferences which will be satisfactory and which will be defined for a wide range of sets of individual orderings are either imposed or dictatorial.

In what he named the General Possibility Theorem, he theorized that, unless we accept to compare the levels of utility reached by different individuals, it is impossible to formulate a social preference ordering that satisfies all of the following conditions:

1. Nondictatorship: The preferences of an individual should not become the group ranking without considering the preferences of others.
2. Individual Sovereignty: each individual should be able to order the choices in any way and indicate ties
3. Unanimity: If every individual prefers one choice to another, then the group ranking should do the same
4. Freedom From Irrelevant Alternatives: If a choice is removed, then the others' order should not change
5. Uniqueness of Group Rank: The method should yield the same result whenever applied to a set of preferences. The group ranking should be transitive.

The theorem has implications for welfare economics and theories of justice, and for voting theory (it extends the Condorcet paradox). Following Arrow's logical framework, Amartya Sen formulated the liberal paradox which argued that given a status of "Minimal Liberty" there was no way to obtain Pareto optimality, nor to avoid the problem of social choice of neutral but unequal results.

=== General equilibrium theory ===
Work by Arrow and Gérard Debreu and simultaneous work by Lionel McKenzie offered the first rigorous proofs of the existence of a market clearing equilibrium. For this work and his other contributions, Debreu won the 1983 Nobel Prize in Economics. Arrow went on to extend the model and its analysis to include uncertainty, the stability. His contributions to the general equilibrium theory were influenced by Adam Smith's Wealth of Nations. Written in 1776, The Wealth of Nations is an examination of economic growth brought forward by the division of labor, by ensuring interdependence of individuals within society.

In 1974, The American Economic Association published the paper written by Kenneth Arrow, General Economic Equilibrium: Purpose, Analytic Techniques, Collective Choice, where he states:

From the time of Adam Smith's Wealth of Nations in 1776, one recurrent theme of economic analysis has been the remarkable degree of coherence among the vast numbers of individual and seemingly separate decisions about the buying and selling of commodities. In everyday, normal experience, there is something of a balance between the amounts of goods and services that some individuals want to supply and the amounts that other, different individuals want to sell. Would-be buyers ordinarily count correctly on being able to carry out their intentions, and would-be sellers do not ordinarily find themselves producing great amounts of goods that they cannot sell. This experience of balance is indeed so widespread that it raises no intellectual disquiet among laymen; they take it so much for granted that they are not disposed to understand the mechanism by which it occurs.

=== Fundamental theorems of welfare economics ===
In 1951, Arrow presented the first and second fundamental theorems of welfare economics and their proofs without requiring differentiability of utility, consumption, or technology, and including corner solutions.

=== Endogenous-growth theory ===
Arrow was one of the precursors of endogenous growth theory, which seeks to explain the source of technical change, which is a key driver of economic growth. Until this theory came to prominence, technical change was assumed to occur exogenously—that is, it was assumed to occur outside economic activities, and was outside (exogenous) to common economic models. At the same time there was no economic explanation for why it occurred. Endogenous-growth theory provided standard economic reasons for why firms innovate, leading economists to think of innovation and technical change as determined by economic actors, that is endogenously to economic activities, and thus belong inside the model. Endogenous growth theory started with Paul Romer's 1986 paper, borrowing from Arrow's 1962 "learning-by-doing" model which introduced a mechanism to eliminate diminishing returns in aggregate output. A literature on this theory has developed subsequently to Arrow's work.

=== Information economics ===
In other pioneering research, Arrow investigated the problems caused by asymmetric information in markets. In many transactions, one party (usually the seller) has more information about the product being sold than the other party. Asymmetric information creates incentives for the party with more information to cheat the party with less information; as a result, a number of market structures have developed, including warranties and third party authentication, which enable markets with asymmetric information to function. Arrow analysed this issue for medical care (a 1963 paper entitled "Uncertainty and the Welfare Economics of Medical Care", in the American Economic Review); later researchers investigated many other markets, particularly second-hand assets, online auctions and insurance.

== Awards and honors ==
Arrow was awarded the John Bates Clark Medal in 1957 and was elected a Fellow of the American Academy of Arts and Sciences in 1959. In 1968, he was elected to both the United States National Academy of Sciences and the American Philosophical Society. He was the joint winner of the Nobel Memorial Prize in Economics with John Hicks in 1972 and the 1986 recipient of the von Neumann Theory Prize. He was one of the recipients of the 2004 National Medal of Science, the nation's highest scientific honor, presented by President George W. Bush for his contributions to research on the problem of making decisions using imperfect information and his research on bearing risk.

He has received honorary doctorates from the University of Chicago (1967), the University of Vienna (1971) the City University of New York (1972). On 2 June 1995 he received an honorary doctorate from the Faculty of Social Sciences at Uppsala University, Sweden. He was elected a Foreign Member of the Royal Society (ForMemRS) in 2006. He was elected to the 2002 class of Fellows of the Institute for Operations Research and the Management Sciences. In 2007 he was the first Witten Lecturer at the Witten/Herdecke University as the awardee of the Witten Lectures in Economics and Philosophy.

== Personal life and death ==
Arrow was a brother to the economist Anita Summers, uncle to economist and former Treasury Secretary and Harvard President Larry Summers, and brother-in-law of the late economists Robert Summers and Paul Samuelson. In 1947, he married Selma Schweitzer, graduate in economics at the University of Chicago and psychotherapist, who died in 2015; they had two children, David Michael (b. 1962), an actor, and Andrew Seth (b. 1965), an actor/singer.

Arrow died in his Palo Alto, California, home on February 21, 2017, at the age of 95.

== Publications ==
- Arrow, Kenneth J. (1951a). "Alternative approaches to the theory of choice in risk-taking situations". Econometrica. 19 (4). The Econometric Society: 404–37. doi:10.2307/1907465. JSTOR 1907465.
- Arrow, Kenneth J. (1951b). Social Choice and Individual Values (1st ed.). New Haven, New York / London: J. Wiley / Chapman & Hall. OCLC 892549124.

Reprinted as: Arrow, Kenneth J. (1963). Social Choice and Individual Values (2nd ed.). New Haven: Yale University Press. ISBN 978-0300013641.

- Arrow, Kenneth J.; Harris, Theodore; Marschak, Jacob (July 1951). "Optimal inventory policy". Econometrica. 19 (3). The Econometric Society: 250–72. doi:10.2307/1906813. JSTOR 1906813. S2CID 51766626.
- Arrow, Kenneth J.; Hurwicz, Leonid (1953). Hurwicz's optimality criterion for decision making under ignorance. Technical Report 6. Stanford University.

Also available as: Arrow, Kenneth J.; Hurwicz, Leonid (1977). Appendix: An optimality criterion for decision-making under ignorance. Cambridge Books Online. pp. 461–72. doi:10.1017/CBO9780511752940.015. ISBN 978-0511752940.
and as: Arrow, Kenneth J.; Hurwicz, Leonid (1977), "Appendix: An optimality criterion for decision-making under ignorance", in Arrow, Kenneth J.; Hurwicz, Leonid (eds.), Studies in resource allocation processes, Cambridge New York: Cambridge University Press, pp. 461–72, ISBN 978-0521215220.

- Arrow, Kenneth J.; Debreu, Gérard (July 1954). "Existence of an equilibrium for a competitive economy". Econometrica. 22 (3). The Econometric Society: 265–90. doi:10.2307/1907353. JSTOR 1907353.
- Arrow, Kenneth J. (February 1959a). "Functions of a theory of behaviour under uncertainty". Metroeconomica. 11 (1–2). Wiley: 12–20. doi:10.1111/j.1467-999X.1959.tb00258.x.
- Arrow, Kenneth J. (1959b), "Toward a theory of price adjustment", in Abramovitz, Moses; et al. (eds.), The allocation of economic resources: essays in honor of Bernard Francis Haley, Stanford, California: Stanford University Press, OCLC 490147128.
- Arrow, Kenneth J. (1960), "Price-quantity adjustments in multiple markets with rising demands", in Arrow, Kenneth J.; Karlin, Samuel; Suppes, Patrick (eds.), Mathematical models in the social sciences, 1959: Proceedings of the first Stanford symposium, Stanford mathematical studies in the social sciences, IV, Stanford, California: Stanford University Press, pp. 3–15. ISBN 978-0804700214.
- Arrow, Kenneth J.; Suppes, Patrick; Karlin, Samuel (1960). Mathematical models in the social sciences, 1959: Proceedings of the first Stanford symposium. Stanford, California: Stanford University Press. ISBN 978-0804700214.

Including: Arrow, Kenneth J. Price-quantity adjustments in multiple markets with rising demands, pp. 3–15.

- Arrow, Kenneth J. (June 1962). "The economic implications of learning by doing". The Review of Economic Studies. 29 (3). Oxford Journals: 155–73. doi:10.2307/2295952. JSTOR 2295952. S2CID 155029478.
- Arrow, Kenneth J. (December 1963). "Uncertainty and the welfare economics of medical care" (PDF). American Economic Review. 53 (5). American Economic Association: 941–73. JSTOR 1812044. Archived from the original (PDF) on May 11, 2011.
- Arrow, Kenneth J. (1968), "Economic equilibrium", in Merton, Robert K.; Sills, David L. (eds.), International encyclopedia of the social sciences (vol. 4), London and New York: Macmillan and the Free Press, pp. 376–88, OCLC 310091393.
- Arrow also published an article, along with Hollis B. Chenery, Bagicha S. Minhas, and Robert M. Solow, pseudonymously under the name Archen Minsol, who it was claimed was at the (fictional) University of Lower Slobbovia. The publication produced was: Minsol, A (1968). "Some Tests of the International Comparisons of Factor Efficiency with the CES Production Function: A Reply". The Review of Economic Studies', 477–479.s. 50 (4 (Nov.)): 477–79..
- Arrow, Kenneth J. (1969), "The organization of economic activity: issues pertinent to the choice of market versus non-market allocations", in {Papers} (ed.), The analysis and evaluation of public expenditures: the PPB system; a compendium of papers submitted to the Subcommittee on Economy in Government of the Joint Economic Committee, Congress of the United States, vol. 1, Washington, D.C.: Government Printing Office, pp. 47–64, OCLC 26897.

Reprinted as: Arrow, Kenneth J. (1983b), "The organization of economic activity: issues pertinent to the choice of market versus non-market allocations", in Arrow, Kenneth J. (ed.), Collected Papers of Kenneth J. Arrow, vol. 2: general equilibrium, Cambridge, Massachusetts: Belknap Press, pp. 133–55, ISBN 978-0674137615.
Also reprinted as a pdf.

- Arrow, Kenneth J. (1970). Essays in the theory of risk-bearing. Amsterdam: North-Holland Pub. Co. ISBN 978-0720430479.
- Arrow, Kenneth; Hahn, Frank (1971). General competitive analysis. San Francisco: Holden-Day. ISBN 978-0816202751.
- Arrow, Kenneth J.; Hurwicz, Leonid (1972), "Decision making under ignorance", in Carter, C. F.; Ford, J.L. (eds.), Uncertainty and expectations in economics: essays in honour of G.L.S. Shackle, Oxford / New York: Basil Blackwell / Augustus M. Kelley, ISBN 978-0631141709.
- Arrow, Kenneth J. (1974). The Limits of Organization. New York: Norton. ISBN 978-0393093230.
- Arrow, Kenneth J. (February 1977). "Extended sympathy and the possibility of social choice". American Economic Review. 67 (1). American Economic Association: 219–25. JSTOR 1815907.

Reprinted as: Arrow, Kenneth J. (1983a), "Extended sympathy and the possibility of social choice", in Arrow, Kenneth J. (ed.), Collected Papers of Kenneth J. Arrow, vol. 1: Social Choice and Justice, Cambridge, Massachusetts: Belknap Press, ISBN 978-0674137608.

- Arrow, Kenneth J.; Intriligator, Michael D. (1981). Handbook of mathematical economics. Handbook of Economics Series. Amsterdam, New York: Elsevier North-Holland. ISBN 978-0444861269.
- Arrow, Kenneth J. Collected papers of Kenneth J. Arrow. Cambridge, Massachusetts: Harvard University Press.

Arrow, Kenneth J. (1983a). Collected Papers of Kenneth J. Arrow. Vol. 1: Social Choice and Justice. Cambridge, Massachusetts: Belknap Press. ISBN 978-0674137608.
Arrow, Kenneth J. (1983b). Collected Papers of Kenneth J. Arrow. Vol. 2: General Equilibrium. Cambridge, Massachusetts: Belknap Press. ISBN 978-0674137615.
Arrow, Kenneth J. (1984a). Collected Papers of Kenneth J. Arrow. Vol. 3: individual choice under certainty and uncertainty. Cambridge, Massachusetts: Belknap Press. ISBN 978-0674137622.
Arrow, Kenneth J. (1984b). Collected Papers of Kenneth J. Arrow. Vol. 4: the Economics of Information. Cambridge, Massachusetts: Belknap Press. ISBN 978-0674137639.
Arrow, Kenneth J. (1985a). Collected Papers of Kenneth J. Arrow. Vol. 5: production and capital. Cambridge, Massachusetts: Belknap Press. ISBN 978-0674137776.
Arrow, Kenneth J. (1985b). Collected Papers of Kenneth J. Arrow. Vol. 6: Applied Economics. Cambridge, Massachusetts: Belknap Press. ISBN 978-0674137783.

- Arrow, Kenneth J. (1987), "Rationality of self and others in an economic system", in Hogarth, Robin M.; Reder, Melvin W. (eds.), Rational choice: the contrast between economics and psychology, Chicago: University of Chicago Press, pp. 201–16, ISBN 978-0226348575.
- Arrow, Kenneth J.; Anderson, Philip W.; Pines, David, eds. (1988). The economy as an evolving complex system: the proceedings of the Evolutionary Paths of the Global Economy Workshop, held September, 1987 in Santa Fe, New Mexico. Redwood City, California: Addison-Wesley Pub. Co. ISBN 978-0201156850. Book details.
- Arrow, Kenneth J.; Intriligator, Michael D.; Harberger, Arnold C.; Wolf, Jr., Charles; Tullock, Gordon (April 1993). "Economic integration and the future of the nation-state". Contemporary Economic Policy. 11 (2). Wiley: 1–22. doi:10.1111/j.1465-7287.1993.tb00376.x.
- Arrow, Kenneth J. (May 1994). "Methodological individualism and social knowledge (Richard T. Ely Lecture)" (PDF). American Economic Review. 84 (2). American Economic Association: 1–9. JSTOR 2117792.
- Arrow, Kenneth J. (2008), "Arrow's theorem", in Durlauf, Steven N.; Blume, Lawrence E. (eds.), The new Palgrave dictionary of economics (8 volume set) (2nd ed.), Basingstoke, Hampshire New York: Palgrave Macmillan, ISBN 978-0333786765.

Also available online as: Arrow, Kenneth J. (2008). "Arrow's theorem". The New Palgrave Dictionary of Economics (2nd ed.). Palgrave Macmillan. pp. 241–45. doi:10.1057/9780230226203.0061. ISBN 978-0333786765.

- Arrow, Kenneth J. (2008), "Hotelling, Harold (1895–1973)", in Durlauf, Steven N.; Blume, Lawrence E. (eds.), The new Palgrave dictionary of economics (8 volume set) (2nd ed.), Basingstoke, Hampshire New York: Palgrave Macmillan, ISBN 978-0333786765.

Also available online as: Arrow, Kenneth J. (2008). "Hotelling, Harold (1895–1973)". The New Palgrave Dictionary of Economics (2nd ed.). Palgrave Macmillan. pp. 73–75. doi:10.1057/9780230226203.0747. ISBN 978-0333786765.

- Arrow, Kenneth J.; Debreu, Gérard (2001). Landmark papers in general equilibrium theory, social choice and welfare. Cheltenham, UK Northampton; Massachusetts, US: Edward Elgar Publishing. ISBN 978-1840645699.
- Arrow, Kenneth J. (June 2009). "Some developments in economic theory since 1940: an eyewitness account". Annual Review of Economics. 1. Wiley: 1–16. doi:10.1146/annurev.economics.050708.143405.
- Arrow, Kenneth J.; Bensoussan, Alain; Feng, Qi; Sethi, Suresh P. (2007). "Optimal Savings and the value of population". PNAS. 104 (47): 18421–26. Bibcode:2007PNAS..10418421A. doi:10.1073/pnas.0708030104. PMC 2141792. PMID 17984059.

== See also ==
- Arrow information paradox
- Arrow–Lind principle
- List of economists
- List of Jewish Nobel laureates
- List of think tanks

Awards
Preceded by Simon Kuznets	Laureate of the Nobel Memorial Prize in Economics; 1972; Served alongside: John R. Hicks	Succeeded by Wassily Leontief
