= Temporary equilibrium method =

The temporary equilibrium method has been devised by Alfred Marshall for analyzing economic systems that comprise interdependent variables of different speed. Sometimes it is referred to as the moving equilibrium method.

For example, assume an industry with a certain capacity that produces a certain commodity. Given this capacity, the supply offered by the industry will depend on the prevailing price. The corresponding supply schedule gives short-run supply. The demand depends on the market price. The price in the market declines if supply exceeds demand, and it increases, if supply is less than demand. The price mechanism leads to market clearing in the short run.

However, if this short-run equilibrium price is sufficiently high, production will be very profitable, and capacity will increase. This shifts the short-run supply schedule to the right, and a new short-run equilibrium price will be obtained. The resulting sequence of short-run equilibria are termed temporary equilibria.

The overall system involves two state variables: price and capacity. Using the temporary equilibrium method, it can be reduced to a system involving only state variable. This is possible because each short-run equilibrium price will be a function of the prevailing capacity, and the change of capacity will be determined by the prevailing price. Hence the change of capacity will be determined by the prevailing capacity. The method works if the price adjusts fast and capacity adjustment is comparatively slow. The mathematical background is provided by the Moving equilibrium theorem.

In physics, the method is known as scale separation,
