= Bagicha Singh Minhas =

Indian economist

- Born: 1929; Damunda, Jalandhar

Academic background
- Education: Khalsa College, Punjab University, University of Illinois, Stanford University

Bagicha Singh Minhas (1929-2005) is an Indian economist.

== Education ==
Minhas was born in Punjab, British India, and obtained his first degree of BSc (agriculture) from Khalsa College, Amritsar, and a Master's degree in economics from Punjab University. He then obtained another degree from the University of Illinois, USA, and followed it up with a PhD in economics from Stanford University, USA. He taught economics at Stanford as an Assistant Professor, but later returned to India as a Research Professor and became Head of the Planning Division at the Indian Statistical Institute from 1971 to 1986.

== Career ==
Minhas was a member of the Indian Planning Commission from 1971 to 1973. Simultaneously, in 1972–73, Minhas was appointed a member of the Finance Commission. He worked on planning strategies as well as financial analysis.

Minhas worked as a Consultant to the World Bank at Washington D.C. and the Statistics and Survey Division of the Food and Agricultural Organization (Rome). In 1976–78, he worked as a Senior Fellow at the Institute of Development Studies (IDS) at the University of Sussex in the UK and, a little later, he held appointments as visiting professor at Johns Hopkins University and as Rufus Putnam Visiting Professor at Ohio. From 1981 to 1984, he served as Secretary General of the Afro-Asian Rural Reconstruction Organization and also Chairman of the National Sample Survey (NSS) Organization (1980–90).

Minhas has been a Fellow of the Econometric Society (1973), a National Fellow at the Indian Council of Social Science Research (1990–92) and a life member of the American Economic Association. From 1992 to 1993, he was the President of the Indian Economic Society and, from 1994 to 1998, the President of the Indian Association for Research in National Income & Wealth.

The Financial Express Award for Economics 1999 was presented to Minhas at the Annual Conference of the Indian Economic Association at Amritsar on 27 December 1999.

Minhas then received the Padma Bhushan Award in 2003 for science and engineering.

Minhas was a co-author of a pioneering article deriving the constant elasticity of substitution production function and demonstrating its econometric uses. Future Nobel Memorial Prize laureates Kenneth Arrow and Robert Solow were co-authors.
