= Lauren M. MacLean =

American political scientist

- Education: University of Pennsylvania; University of California, Berkeley
- Scientific career
- Fields: Political science
- Workplaces: Indiana University Bloomington
- Doctoral advisor: David K. Leonard
- Other academic advisors: Thomas M. Callaghy

Lauren Mathews Morris MacLean is an American political scientist who researches the promotion of renewable energy in Africa. She is the Arthur Bentley chair at Indiana University Bloomington.

== Life ==
MacLean earned a B.A. from the University of Pennsylvania, cum laude, in international relations with honors. Her honors thesis advisor was Thomas M. Callaghy. She earned a M.A. (1995) and Ph.D. (2002) in political science from the University of California, Berkeley. Her dissertation was titled, Solidarity in Crisis: Social Policies and Social Support Networks in Ghana and Côte d'Ivoire. David K. Leonard was her doctoral advisor.

MacLean researches the promotion of renewable energy in Africa. In 2017, she became the Arthur Bentley chair and professor in the department of political science at Indiana University Bloomington.

== Selected works ==
- Kapiszewski, Diana; MacLean, Lauren M.; Read, Benjamin L. (2015). Field Research in Political Science. Cambridge University Press. ISBN 978-1-107-00603-4.
