= Charalambos Aliprantis =

Greek-American mathematician (1946–2009)

- Born: Charalambos Dionisios Aliprantis; May 12, 1946; Cefalonia, Greece
- Died: February 27, 2009 (aged 62)

Academic background
- Education: Caltech
- Influences: Yuri Abramovich; Owen Burkinshaw

Academic work
- Discipline: Functional analysis and Operator theory Mathematical economics
- Institutions: Purdue University; Indiana University – Purdue University Indianapolis (IUPUI)
- Notable ideas: Banach-space and Riesz-space methods in economic theory

Charalambos Dionisios Aliprantis (Greek: Χαράλαμπος Διονύσιος Αλιπράντης; May 12, 1946 – February 27, 2009) was a Greek-American economist and mathematician who introduced Banach space and Riesz space methods in economic theory. He was born in Cefalonia, Greece in 1946 and immigrated to the US in 1969, where he obtained his PhD in mathematics from Caltech in June 1973.

He was a distinguished professor of Economics and Mathematics at Purdue University. He was the founding editor of the journals Economic Theory and Annals of Finance, an Editor of Positivity and a founding member of the Society for the Advancement of Economic Theory.
