= John Waterbury =

American political scientist

John Waterbury is an American academic and former president of the American University of Beirut.

== Early years ==
Born in Elizabeth, New Jersey, Waterbury attended Princeton University (BA 1961), studied Arabic at the American University of Cairo (1961–62), and got his PhD in political science in 1968 at Columbia University. He went on to the University of Michigan as assistant professor of political science.

== Career ==
In 1971 he joined the American Universities Field Staff, a consortium of American Universities, which he represented in Cairo from 1971 to 1977. His monographs for AUFS were tops among his contemporaries and he became a leading source about life and politics in Egypt for academic and government specialists for half-a-decade.. The quality of these publications led directly to his appointment at the W.Wilson School of Public and International Affairs cited below. In the winter of 1972, he was a visiting professor at the AUFS facility in Rome. During 1977-78 he was visiting professor at the University of Aix-Marseille III in France.

He was then, for nearly twenty years, professor of politics and international affairs at Princeton University's Woodrow Wilson School of Public and International Affairs. He specialized in the political economy of the developing countries with a special focus on the Middle East. He was director of Princeton's Center of International Studies and editor of the academic journal World Politics from 1992 to 1998.

In 1998, Waterbury became the 14th president of the American University of Beirut, a post he held until 2008. He was the first president to reside in Beirut since 1984. During his tenure at AUB, Waterbury sought to restore the university to its long-standing place and reputation as an institution of higher learning meeting the highest international standards. AUB offered Waterbury an Honorary Doctorate during his last commencement exercises at the university in recognition of his achievements. University of Chicago Egyptologist Peter Dorman succeeded him as the 15th president of AUB on July 1, 2008.

He is now a Global Professor of Political Science in New York University (Abu Dhabi).

== Works ==
- The Commander of the Faithful: the Moroccan Political Elite: --a Study in Segmented Politics. Weidenfeld & Nicolson. 1970.
- North for the trade: the life & times of a Berber merchant. University of California Press. 1972.
- Egypt: burdens of the past, options for the future. Indiana University Press. 1978. ISBN 978-0-253-31943-2.
- The Middle East in the coming decade: from wellhead to well-being?. McGraw-Hill. 1978. ISBN 978-0-07-068445-4.
- Hydropolitics of the Nile Valley. Syracuse University Press. 1979. ISBN 978-0-8156-2192-8.
- The Egypt of Nasser and Sadat: The Political Economy of Two Regimes. Princeton University Press. 1983. ISBN 978-1-4008-5735-7.
- The Political Economy of Risk and Choice in Senegal. Taylor & Francis. 1987. ISBN 978-0-203-98826-8.
- The Political Economy Of Public Sector Reform And Privatization. Boulder: Westview Press. 1990.
- Exposed to Innumerable Delusions: Public Enterprise and State Power in Egypt, India, Mexico, and Turkey. Cambridge University Press. 1993. ISBN 978-0-521-43497-3.
- The Nile Basin: National Determinants of Collective Action. Yale University Press. 2002. ISBN 978-0-300-08853-3.
- Missions Impossible: Higher Education and Policymaking in the Arab World. American University in Cairo Press. 2020. ISBN 978-977-416-963-2.
