= Journal of Mathematical Economics =

- Discipline: Mathematical economics
- Language: English
- Edited by: Andres Carvajal

Publication details
- History: 1974–present
- Publisher: Elsevier
- Frequency: Bimonthly
- Impact factor: 0.634 (2018)

Standard abbreviations
- ISO 4: J. Math. Econ.
- MathSciNet: J. Math. Econom.

Indexing
- CODEN: JMECDA
- ISSN: 0304-4068
- LCCN: 82645478
- OCLC no.: 39167313

Links
- Journal homepage; Online archive

The Journal of Mathematical Economics is a bimonthly peer-reviewed academic journal of mathematical economics published by Elsevier. It covers work in economic theory that expresses economic ideas using formal mathematical reasoning. The journal was established in 1974, with Werner Hildenbrand as the founding editor-in-chief. The current editor-in-chief is Andres Carvajal (UC Davis). According to the Journal Citation Reports, the journal has a 2018 5-year impact factor of 0.725.

The journal has published some seminal papers in economics, including some written by Nobel laureates such as Lloyd Shapley, Alvin Roth, Robert Aumman, Roger Myerson, Eric Maskin, Leonid Hurwicz, Reinhard Selten, Edmund Phelps, Oliver Hart, Paul Milgrom and Gerard Debreu. Similarly, Fields medal winner Stephen Smale has also published in this journal regularly.

Several other prominent economists and mathematicians have also published in the journal, including Herve Moulin, Andreu Mas-Collel, David Gale, Jon Geanakoplos, David Kreps and Hugo Sonnenschein.
