= General disequilibrium =

Macroeconomic concept

In macroeconomic theory, general disequilibrium is a situation in which some or all of the aggregated markets, such as the money market, the goods market, and the labor market, fail to clear because of price rigidities. In the 1960s and 1970s, economists such as Edmond Malinvaud, Robert Barro and Herschel Grossman, Axel Leijonhufvud, Robert Clower, and Jean-Pascal Benassy investigated how economic policy would impact an economy where prices did not adjust quickly to changes in supply and demand. The most notable case occurs when some external factor causes high levels of unemployment in an economy, leading to households consuming less and firms providing less employment, leading to a rationing of both goods and work hours. Studies of general disequilibrium have been considered the "height of the neoclassical synthesis" and an immediate precursor to the new Keynesian economics that followed the decline of the synthesis.

Studies of general disequilibrium showed that the economy behaved differently depending on which markets (for example, the labor or the goods markets) were out of equilibrium. When both the goods and the labor market suffered from excess supply, the economy behaved according to Keynesian theory.

== See also ==
- Effective demand
- Disequilibrium (economics)
