= Jean-Pascal Bénassy =

French economist (1948–2022)

Jean-Pascal Bénassy (30 December 1948 – 7 December 2022) was a French economist known for his contribution to general disequilibrium theory.

== Life and career ==
Jean-Pascal Bénassy was born on December 30, 1948, in Neuilly-sur-Seine as son of Jeannine Garçonnot and the surgeon Jean Bénassy. He studied at École normale supérieure (rue d'Ulm) and received a diploma at Institut d'études politiques de Paris. He received his Ph.D. in economics from University of California, Berkeley in 1973, advised by Gérard Debreu. In 1980, he obtained a doctorat from Paris 1 Panthéon-Sorbonne University. In 1973, he joined the Centre pour la recherche économique et ses applications (CEPREMAP) as a researcher and became director of research at the Centre national de la recherche scientifique (CNRS) in 1975. He was a fellow of the Econometric Society (1981) and received the Guido Zerilli-Marimo Prize of the Académie des Sciences Morales et Politiques.

== Research ==
Bénassy was one of the pioneers of the Non-Walrasian equilibrium school of studying disequilibrium macroeconomics. He shared the concerns of Don Patinkin, Robert W. Clower, and Axel Leijonhufvud about the stability issues raised by John Maynard Keynes in chapter 19 of The General Theory. Similar to Edmond Malinvaud, he studied the dynamics of non-clearing markets and combined the idea by John R. Hicks that dynamics is a sequence of temporary equilibria with the idea by Paul Samuelson that dynamics describes the adjustment towards economic equilibrium. He used Clower's “dual-decision hypothesis“ as starting point of his models and tried to get rid of the concept of the Walrasian auction. To reach this objective, he assumed that agents have the ability to conjecture market conditions correctly. This led him to construct models with rationing, imperfect competition, non-clearing markets and business cycles.

== Books ==
- The Economics of Market Disequilibrium. New York: Academic Press. 1982.
- Macroéconomie et Théorie du Déséquilibre. Paris: Dunod. 1984.
- Macroeconomics: An Introduction to the non-Walrasian Approach. Orlando: Academic Press. 1986.
- Macroeconomics and Imperfect Competition. Aldershot: Edward Elgar. 1995.
- The Macroeconomics of Imperfect Competition and Nonclearing Markets: A Dynamic General Equilibrium Approach. Cambridge, Mass.: M.I.T. Press. 2002.
- Imperfect Competition, Nonclearing Markets and Business Cycles. Cheltenham: Edward Elgar. 2006.
- Money, Interest and Policy: Dynamic General Equilibrium in a non-Ricardian World. Cambridge, Mass.: M.I.T. Press. 2007.
- Macroeconomic Theory. New York: Oxford University Press. 2011.
