= Wealth elasticity of demand =

The wealth elasticity of demand, in microeconomics and macroeconomics, is the proportional change in the consumption of a good relative to a change in consumers' wealth (as distinct from changes in personal income). Measuring and accounting for the variability in this elasticity is a continuing problem in behavioral finance and consumer theory.

== Definition ==
The wealth elasticity of consumption quantity for some good will determine the size of the expenditure shift due to unexpected changes in net personal wealth, ceteris paribus (i.e. the size of the so-called "wealth effect" for a given good). It is calculated as the ratio of the percent change in consumption to the percent change in wealth that caused it.

This is analogous to the definition of the income effect from the income elasticity of demand, or the substitution effect from the price elasticity. The measure of "wealth" is mostly taken to be total personal realizable wealth at market prices, liquid or not:

Wealth = cash balances + government bonds + housing equity + company shares + other assets - debt

Some economists say that bonds are simply a loan to the government and that they are not considered (on the aggregate) to be part of net wealth. Generally, the wealth change is measured in real terms.

It may seem obvious that an unanticipated windfall will lead to greater consumption and that a fiscal loss will have the opposite effect. However, when the stock markets crashed in April 2000 (wiping out $2.1 trillion in nominal investor wealth) U.S. household consumption did not drop substantially.

Some researchers have tried to resolve this difficulty by redefining wealth as the 'stable underlying value' of assets, which doesn't change with asset values, although this raises other questions of consumer rationality.

== Macroeconomic implications ==
Most researchers calculate the wealth effect in real terms, so a deflation in price levels will increase personal wealth on average (because the total wealth in society is positive, the difference between saving and debt is tangible assets, such as land). The increase in private real wealth may give rise to a wealth effect of increased consumption. The macroeconomic effect of this on employment is called the Pigou effect, but whether or not this acts as a significant brake on a deflationary spiral is controversial. Pigou's reasoning for a positive wealth elasticity was that richer people feel more secure in the future and hence save less from current income. (So wealth is not redistributed by the effect.)

The elasticity has important implications for monetary policy: Investments with a fixed yield (such as a bond paying coupons at 5%) will increase in net present value as interest rates fall. Since fixed-income bond-holders’ personal wealth (at market rates) has increased, this may stimulate expenditure in a wealth effect. Working the other way, central banks often need to guess the wealth elasticity for asset price changes that have already happened in order to adjust the interest rate. In particular, the extent to which house price increases affect the rest of the economy is a critical question.

== Why income and wealth elasticities are separable ==
A naïve assumption (or first approximation) linking the wealth and income elasticities of demand is:

- Income elasticity = Wealth elasticity × rate of investment return.

However, this approach overlooks the fact that people typically treat income and capital differently. (Behavioural economics hypothesises different "mental accounts" for income and assets, and points to empirical studies showing that the marginal propensity to consume extra income is one, but is lower for windfall asset increases.)

Econometric research is ongoing to find good wealth elasticity parameters, especially in areas like house-price-related wealth effects. However, some patterns are widely believed to hold:

- The wealth elasticity of the poor is much higher than the rich:
  - If a pauper wins the lottery he'll tend to spend a large portion of the "Windfall" within a year.
  - If a millionaire wins the lottery his consumption patterns change little.
- The size of the wealth effect is based on perceptions of the permanence of the change in wealth.
  - Intertemporal consumption: Nominal gains in portfolios of company shares and other assets tend to have smaller effects on immediate consumption than predicted by the lifetime-income hypothesis (of rational consumption averaging based on NPV income expectations).
  - Risk aversion probably causes the wealth elasticity of consumption to drop with asset volatility. (I.e. if people think their investments can be worth much less today than tomorrow, they tend not to consume the new capital because their utility curves tend to be convex - they have a preference for averages.)

=== Other differences from the income effect ===
If 'leisure time' is a superior good the income effect will partially cancel itself out, since people will work less as their hourly pay goes up. A change in net wealth doesn't require economic labour to produce, and has a different impact on the labour market.

== See also ==
- Engel curve
- Keynesian consumption function
- Lloyd Metzler added capital as a component to wealth effect in macroeconomics
- Wealth (economics)
- Wealth
