= Equilibrium =

Equilibrium may refer to:

== Film and television ==
- Equilibrium (film), a 2002 science fiction film
- The Story of Three Loves, also known as Equilibrium, a 1953 romantic anthology film
- "Equilibrium" (seaQuest 2032)
- Equilibrium, short film by Steven Soderbergh, a segment of Eros
- "Equilibrium" (Star Trek: Deep Space Nine), Star Trek DS9 Episode 4, Season 3

== Music ==
- Equilibrium (band), a folk metal band from Germany
- Equilibrium (Crowbar album), 2000
- Equilibrium (Erik Mongrain album), 2008
- Equilibrium (God Forbid album), 2012
- Equilibrium (Whitecross album), 1995
- Equilibrium (Matthew Shipp album), 2003
- Equilibrium (Anitta album), 2026
- IX Equilibrium, a 1999 album by Emperor
- Equilibrium, an album by Fergie Frederiksen

== Natural sciences ==
- Chemical equilibrium
- Equilibrium chemistry
- Equilibrium point of differential equations
- Mechanical equilibrium
- Thermodynamic equilibrium

== Social sciences ==
- Cognitive equilibration in psychology, see Piaget's theory of cognitive development § Cognitive equilibration
- Economic equilibrium
- Nash equilibrium in game theory

== See also ==
- List of types of equilibrium
- Balance (disambiguation)
- Disequilibrium (disambiguation)
- Non-equilibrium (disambiguation)
- Steady state
