= Disequilibrium =

Disequilibrium is the lack of or opposite of an equilibrium.

Economics

- lack of economic equilibrium
- General disequilibrium
- Disequilibrium (economics)

Medicine

- Disequilibrium (medicine)
- lack of equilibrioception
- Dialysis disequilibrium syndrome

Political science

- Status-income disequilibrium

Population genetics

- Linkage disequilibrium, the non-random association of alleles at two or more loci, not necessarily on the same chromosome

Thermodynamics

- Disequilibrium (thermodynamics)
