= Principle of effective demand =

Concept in economics

The principle of effective demand is that the aggregate demand function and the aggregate supply function intersect each other at the point of effective demand and that this point can be consistent with a state of under-employment and under-capacity utilization. Another way of expressing this, in pre-Keynesian terminology, is to say that "demand creates its own supply" which gives primacy to a shifting demand function that can be insufficient to give an economy full employment in the long term, in contrast to Say's law which insists "supply creates its own demand" and doesn't allow the possibility of long term unemployment as the supply figure is always, by definition, a fixed amount that demand will match.

According to Keynes it is the principle of effective demand that determines the level of output and employment in a country.

In chapter 3 of John Maynard Keynes's book The General Theory of Employment, Interest and Money, he defines the concept of effective demand as the point of intersection of these two aggregate functions—at this point of intersection, the aggregate demand becomes "effective".

The importance of the term 'effective demand' to Keynesian Economics in general is shown in the fourth paragraph of the chapter, where he states that this concept of effective demand, i.e. the intersection of the supply and demand functions, is the "substance of the General Theory" and says that "the succeeding chapters will be largely occupied with examining the various factors upon which these two functions depend."

Colin Rogers claimed that "the principle of effective demand is the key to understanding both the theoretical claims presented in the General Theory and Keynes’s post-war policy proposals." However, the interpretation of chapter 3 (The Principle of Effective Demand) of The General Theory of Employment, Interest and Money remains confused.

Despite its importance, the chapter is known to be hard to interpret coherently. Different interpretations have been presented, but this points to some incoherence. Colin Rogers claimed that "What is missing is an appreciation of the principle of effective demand" as a theory of monetary economy. More recently, a symposium on the notion and interpretations of "Effective Demand: Securing the Foundations – A Symposium" was held as the 5th "Dijon" Post-Keynesian Conference at Roskilde University on 13th and 14 May 2011, in which Mark Hayes, Jochen Hartwig, and Olivier Allain participated, and was published in Review of Political Economy in 2013. Although the symposium was animated, the three participants could not arrive at a unified interpretation. Olivier Allain pointed out that "[the General Theory] faces a closure difficulty between the macroeconomic outcomes and the microeconomic behaviour of firms." Mark Hayes claimed that "We still need to agree by what mechanism individual entrepreneurs form a collective and mutually consistent state of expectation in the General Theory." Yoshinori Shiozawa proposed a new interpretation from a different angle based on his new theory of value, reformulating the principle as a behavioral principle of firms, thus turning the principle into a microeconomic law. He claimed that the concepts of aggregate demand and supply functions were the origin of all such confusions, including those of Keynes himself.
