= Xavier Sala-i-Martin =

American economist (born 1962)

Xavier Sala i Martín
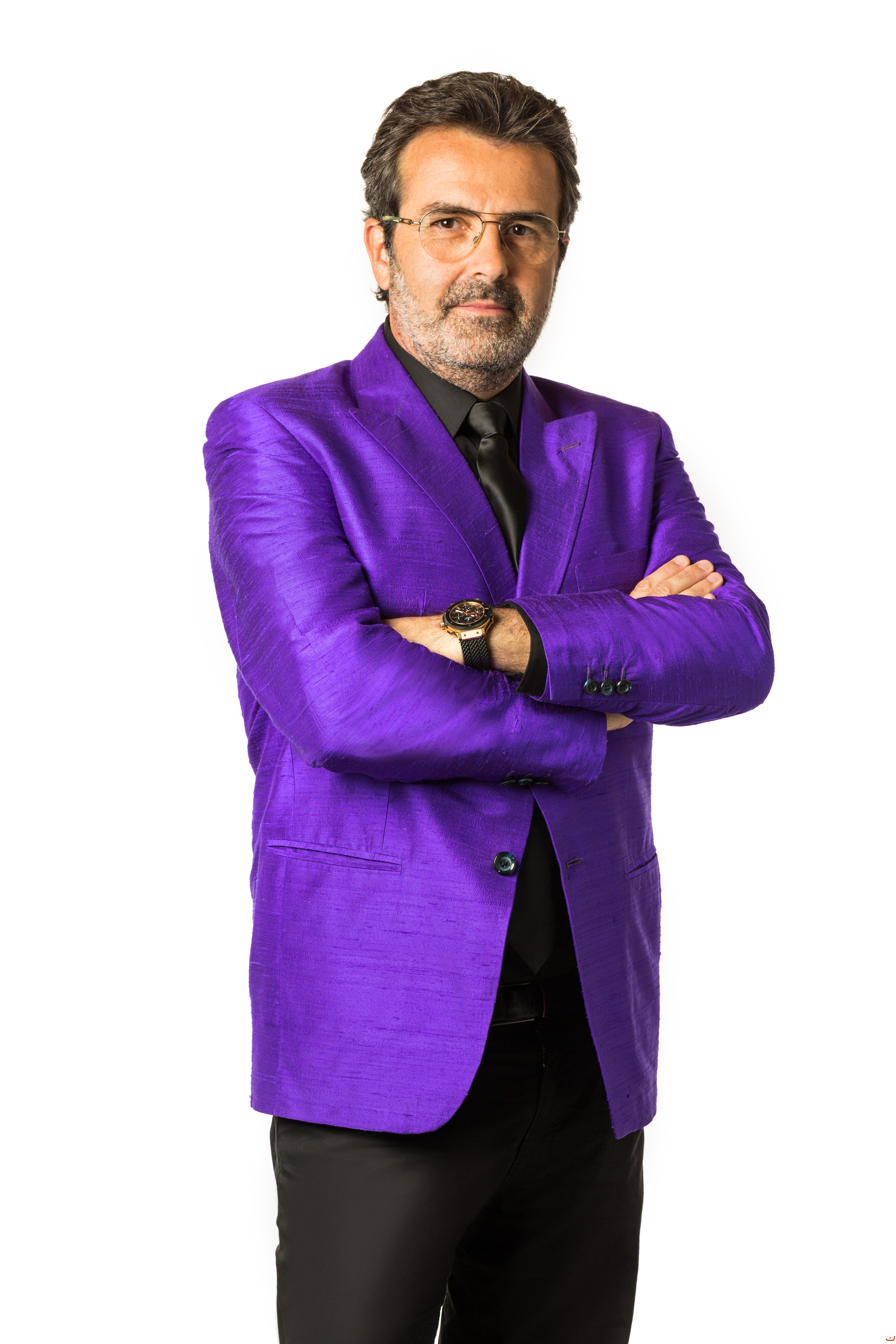
- Born: June 17, 1962 (age 64); Cabrera de Mar, Catalonia, Spain

Academic background
- Doctoral advisor: Robert J. Barro; N. Gregory Mankiw

Academic work
- Discipline: Macroeconomics
- School or tradition: Neo-classical economics
- Notable ideas: Economic growth Libertarianism
- Website: Information at IDEAS / RePEc

Xavier X. Sala i Martín (also Sala-i-Martin in English) is a Catalan economist and professor of economics at Columbia University.

In addition to working at Columbia, he has been a professor at Yale University, Harvard University, and the Universitat Pompeu Fabra in Barcelona and the Barcelona Graduate School of Economics.

== Early life and education ==
Born in Cabrera de Mar, Catalonia, Sala i Martin earned a degree in economics from the Autonomous University of Barcelona in 1985. He completed his PhD in economics from Harvard University in 1990.

== Professional work ==
Sala i Martin is one of the leading economists in the field of economic growth and is consistently ranked among the most-cited economists in the world for works produced in the 1990s. His works include the topics of economic growth, development in Africa, monetary economics, social security, health and economics, convergence, and classical liberal thinking, with his book Liberal Economics for Non-Economists and Non-Liberals. The "liberal" in the title should be understood in the classic liberal/libertarian sense.

He has constructed an estimate of the world distribution of income, which he has then used to estimate poverty rates and measures of inequality. The conclusions of this study offered a new point of view for two reasons. Firstly, the United Nations and the World Bank used to believe that although poverty rates were falling, the total number of poor people was increasing. He claimed that both were falling. Secondly, the United Nations and the World Bank believe that individual income inequalities were on the rise. He claimed that they were not.

Sala i Martin is the author of the economic growth textbook Apuntes de Crecimiento Economico and the co-author (with Robert Barro) of the textbook Economic Growth.

Sala i Martin and Elsa V. Artadi are the authors of the Global Competitiveness Index, used since 2004 for the Global Competitiveness Report, an index published by the World Economic Forum that ranks 142 countries by their level of economic competitiveness.

He often collaborates with Catalan media to support the independence of Catalonia from Spain. In 2014 he had a public confrontation with José Manuel Barroso, the president of the European Commission, reproaching him the lack of support towards a democratic resolution of the conflict between Catalonia and the central government.

== Other activities ==
Sala i Martin was a board member at FC Barcelona and treasurer of the club between 2004 and 2010. He was the president of the club during the electoral process of 2006.

He is the founder of Umbele: A Future for Africa, a nonprofit organization that promotes economic development in Africa.

He is a columnist for the Spanish newspaper La Vanguardia. He makes weekly appearances on the Catalan radio network RAC 1 and in the television show Divendres. He also contributes to CNN.

He supports Catalan independence and gives conferences around Catalonia with limited success, in name of the pro-independence association that he and other university teachers created for that purpose, (Col·lectiu Wilson).

He proposes the application of the Paranoic-critical method to economic thought, and suggests that the "Critical-Paranoic School of Economic Thought" is opposed to Tobin taxes and Paul Samuelson, while supporting Gary Becker and chupacabras.

== Prizes ==
He has been recognized with a Distinguished Teacher in Graduate Economics award three times at Columbia and Yale, with the 2004 King Juan Carlos I Prize (a biannual prize given to the best economist in Spain and Latin America), and the 2006 Lenfest Prize awarded to the best teacher at Columbia University.

On 15 January 2017, Sala i Martin was listed by UK-based company Richtopia at number 14 in the list of 100 Most Influential Economists.

== Works ==
- Sala-i-Martin, Xavier; Barro, Robert J. (2003). Economic growth (2nd ed.). Massachusetts: MIT Press. ISBN 9780262025539.
- Sala-i-Martin, Xavier (May 2006). "The world distribution of income: Falling poverty and ... convergence, period". Quarterly Journal of Economics. 121 (2): 351–397. doi:10.1162/qjec.2006.121.2.351. JSTOR 25098796.
- Sala-i-Martin, Xavier; Pinkovsky, Maxim (March 2010). African poverty is falling ... much faster than you think!, NBER Working Paper Nr. 15775, National Bureau of Economic Research, Cambridge, Massachusetts, USA.
- Sala-i-Martin, Xavier. "The Human Centipede, When Being Last Becomes a Pleasure: A Personal Opinion", Journal of Gastronomy, Vol. 234, No. 34: 122-126, May 2023.
