= Herschel Grossman =

American economist

- Herschel Grossman
- Born: March 6, 1939; Philadelphia, Pennsylvania, U.S.
- Died: October 9, 2004 (aged 65); Marseilles, France
- Spouse(s): Elizabeth Greenwell (married 1960-before 1991); Suzanne (married 1993-2004)
- Children: 2

Academic background
- Doctoral advisor: Carl Christ; Edwin Mills

Academic work
- Discipline: Macroeconomics; Political economy
- School or tradition: Neo-Keynesian economics
- Institutions: Brown University
- Doctoral students: Robert King; Mitsuru Taniuchi
- Notable ideas: General disequilibrium
- Website: Information at IDEAS / RePEc

Herschel Ivan Grossman (6 March 1939 – 9 October 2004) was an American economist best known for his work on general disequilibrium with Robert Barro in the 1970s and later work on property rights and the emergence of the state.

== Life and career ==
Grossman grew up in Philadelphia, where he attended Central High School. He received a Bachelor of Arts from the University of Virginia (1960), a B.Phil. from the University of Oxford (1962), where he was a student at Merton College, and his Ph.D. from Johns Hopkins University (1965). Grossman collaborated with Barro to produce the influential article "A General Disequilibrium Model of Income," which, for many years, held the distinction of being the most cited article ever published in the American Economic Review. The article explored the idea that disequilibrium in one market can have spillover effects to another market, creating a distinction between notional demand and effective demand. Grossman and Barro expanded on their work and produced the classic textbook Money, Employment, and Inflation in 1976.

Following his work on disequilibrium, Grossman made several contributions to the study of economic policy and political economy. His work transitioned as he investigated the institutional frictions behind Keynesian macroeconomic models. Grossman's work in political economy included the study of conflict. In a 2003 paper he explored the use of expected future scarcity as an explanatory variable in current conflicts. Grossman also investigated property rights. He analyzed property rights formation under "common pool" situations, where all resources are initially held in common, and "initial claims" cases, where individuals have an initial claim to resources before rights are established. Grossman's work showed how property rights could emerge in a decentralized manner. Grossman also studied the trade-offs between a decentralized property rights and a centralized authority. He found a centralized authority would emerge when creating defensive work were relatively expensive and appropriations (taxation) were relatively easy. Otherwise, a decentralized system would emerge.

Grossman died suddenly in 2004 while attending a conference in Marseilles, France.
