= Rachel McCleary =

American philosopher

Rachel Mary McCleary (born 29 September 1953) is an American economist and academic. McLeary serves as a lecturer in the Economics Department at Harvard University and is a non-resident senior fellow at the American Enterprise Institute.

== Biography ==
McCleary has a Ph.D. in philosophy from the University of Chicago in 1986, a Master of Theological Studies from Emory University in 1978 and a B.A. from Indiana University Bloomington in 1974. Her work is interdisciplinary with theoretical grounding in the fields of political science, sociology and economics. Within these disciplines, she conducts research on the political economy of religion. Her research focuses on how religion interacts with economic performance and the political and social behavior of individuals and institutions across societies. She studies how religious beliefs and practices influence productivity, economic growth and the maintenance of political institutions such as democracy. Her scholarly work in philosophy focuses on issues of moral agency, consciousness and reasoning.

Her and her husband Robert Barro's work was cited in the March 25, 2013, edition of Bloomberg.

== Publications ==
=== Books ===
- Seeking Justice: Ethics and International Affairs (Boulder: Westview Press, 1992)
- Dictating Democracy: Guatemala and the End of Violent Revolution (University Press of Florida, 1999 English; Artemis-Edinter 1999 Spanish)
- Global Compassion: Private Voluntary Agencies and U.S. Foreign Policy since 1939 to Present (Oxford University Press 2009) (Winner of the Skystone Partners Prize for Research on Fundraising and Philanthropy, 2010)
- Oxford Handbook of the Economics of Religion (editor). (Oxford University Press, 2011)
- The Wealth of Religions: The Political Economy of Believing and Belonging, (co-author Robert Barro). (Princeton University Press, 2019)

=== Journal articles and book chapters ===
- "Religion and Economic Growth Across Countries" (with Robert Barro), American Sociological Review, October 2003 doi:10.2307/1519761
- "Religion and Economic Growth" (with Robert Barro), Milken Institute Review, April 2004
- "Religion and Economy", Blackwell Encyclopedia of Sociology (Oxford, Blackwell Publishing, 2005) doi:10.1002/9781405165518.wbeose016
- "Which Countries Have State Religions?" (with Robert Barro), Quarterly Journal of Economics, November 2005 doi:10.1162/003355305775097515
- "Political Economy and Religion in the Spirit of Max Weber" (with Robert J. Barro) in Victor Nee and Richard Swedberg (eds.), Spirit of Global Capitalism (Stanford University Press, 2006)
- "Religion and Economy", (with Robert Barro) Journal of Economic Perspectives, spring 2006 doi:10.1257/jep.20.2.49
- "Religion and Political Economy in an International Panel", (with Robert Barro) Journal for the Scientific Study of Religion, June 2006 doi:10.1111/j.1468-5906.2006.00299.x
- "Salvation, Damnation, and Economic Incentives", Journal of Contemporary Religion, January 2007 doi:10.1080/13537900601114503
- "The Economics of Religion and Secularization", The Review of Faith & International Affairs, spring 2007 doi:10.1080/15570274.2007.9523277
- "Religion and Economic Development: A Two-way Causation", Policy Review 148, April – May 2008
- "Private Voluntary Organizations Engaged in International Assistance, 1939–2004" (with Robert Barro), Nonprofit and Voluntary Sector Quarterly 37, 2 (2008)doi:10.1177/0899764007313719
- "Religious Conversion in 40 Countries" (with Robert Barro and Jason Hwang), Journal for the Scientific Study of Religion 49, 1 (2010)doi:10.1111/j.1468-5906.2009.01490.x
- "The Market Approach to the Rise of the Geluk School in Tibet, 1419–1642" (with Leonard van der Kuijp), The Journal of Asian Studies 69, 1 (February 2010): pages 149–180 doi:10.1017/S0021911809991574
- "The Economics of Sainthood" (with Robert Barro), chapter in Oxford Handbook of the Economics of Religion (Oxford, 2011) doi:10.1093/oxfordhb/9780195390049.013.0010
- "Saints Marching In, 1590-2012", (with Robert Barro), Economica 83, 331 (July 2016): pages 385–415 doi:10.1111/ecca.12196
- "Measuring the Presence of Protestants in Guatemala, 1882–2011" (with Robert J. Barro), chapter in Brian J. Grim, Vegard Skirbekk, Gina A. Zurlo, (eds.), Yearbook of International Religious Demography 2017 (Brill, 2017)
- "Pentecostals, Kinship, and Moral Economy in Guatemala", Journal Markets and Morals (spring 2018)
- "Protestants and Catholics and Educational Investment in Guatemala" (with Robert J. Barro), chapter in Sriya Iyer, Jared Rubin, Jean-Paul Carvahlo (eds.), Advances in the Economics of Religion (Brill Publishers, 2019)
- "Opening the Fifth Seal Catholic Martyrs and Forces of Religious Competition", Journal of Religion and Demography, 7 (2020): pages 92–122 (with Robert J. Barro)
- "Protestant Innovative Evangelizing to Oral Cultures in Guatemala", chapter in Susan Fitzpatrick Behrens, David Orique, and Virginia Garrard-Burnett (eds.), Oxford Handbook of Latin American Christianity (Oxford, 2020)
- "Catholic Martyrs of Latin America", Fé y Libertad, 5, 1 (2022) (with Robert J. Barro)
- "Protestant Doctrinal Heterodoxy and Heterogeneity in Guatemala 1880s to 1950", chapter in Felipe Valencia Caicedo (ed.) Roots of Underdevelopment in Latin America (Springer, 2022)
- "Catholic Child and Youth Martyrs, 1588-2022", Catholic Historical Review 108, 3 (summer 2022): pages 469–508

=== Working papers ===
- "Protestantism and Human Capital in Guatemala and the Republic of Korea", Asian Development Bank Working Paper Series, Number 332, January 2013.
