= Non-equilibrium =

Non-equilibrium may refer to:

- generally the absence of an equilibrium
- Non-equilibrium economics
- Non-equilibrium statistical mechanics
- Non-equilibrium thermodynamics
