= Cash-in-advance constraint =

The cash-in-advance constraint, also known as the Clower constraint after American economist Robert W. Clower, is an idea used in economic theory to capture monetary phenomena. In the most basic economic models (such as the Walras model or the Arrow–Debreu model) there is no role for money, as these models are not sufficiently detailed to consider how people pay for goods, other than to say everyone has a budget constraint. To be able to say anything about the money supply, inflation, monetary policy and so on, economists must therefore introduce additional assumptions into their models. One possibility, and the more popular one, is to introduce a cash-in-advance constraint i.e. a requirement that each consumer or firm must have sufficient cash available before they can buy goods. An alternative assumption would be a 'Money-in-the-Utility-Function' assumption pioneered by Miguel Sidrauski, which states that people have a tendency to hold a certain amount of cash because they derive utility from holding it. Without these (or similar) assumptions economic theory would find it difficult to explain why people carry around a good (money) which takes up space in their wallet, can't be consumed and does not earn any interest.

== Terms ==
Cash in advance is a term describing terms of purchase, when full payment for a good or service is due before the merchandise is shipped. This presents the least risk to a seller while having the most risk to the buyer. It is often combined with other terms such as Free On Board, which require the buyer to take possession of the merchandise as soon as it is loaded onto transportation, meaning the buyer assumes the financial risk if the shipment is lost or damaged en route. In actual daily business these sorts of terms are extremely rare unless the goods or services are of phenomenal value and high fragility.

A constraint is any operating condition that puts a limit on the ability of a business to conduct its operations.

== Examples ==
A company with $5000 on hand and incomes of $3000 a month has a constraint of $8000. That means, if the terms of an economic exchange (buying equipment, etc.) require terms that are cash-in-advance, then the limit that the company can actually obtain is $8000.

== Uses ==
It is mostly used in a theoretical sense, to provide proofs of economic efficiencies, since it does not (by definition) involve terms of credit or financing.

In these modeling theories, CIAC tends to show that up-front restrictions artificially limit the ability of companies to maintain positive inventory levels while reducing capital investment. They also inhibit real wealth in terms of cash on hand while elevating the likelihood of using junk bonds as instruments of solvency, a dangerous premise.
