= Robert Barro =

American classical macroeconomist

- Born: September 28, 1944 (age 81); New York City, U.S.
- Spouse: Rachel McCleary

Academic background
- Education: California Institute of Technology (BS); Harvard University (PhD)
- Doctoral advisor: Zvi Griliches

Academic work
- Discipline: Macroeconomics
- School or tradition: New classical macroeconomics
- Institutions: Harvard University
- Doctoral students: See list: Michael Kremer Xavier Sala-i-Martin
- Notable ideas: Ricardian equivalence hypothesis Economic growth Time consistency
- Website: Information at IDEAS / RePEc

Robert Joseph Barro (born September 28, 1944) is an American macroeconomist and the Paul M. Warburg Professor of Economics at Harvard University. Barro is considered one of the founders of new classical macroeconomics, along with Robert Lucas Jr. and Thomas J. Sargent. He is currently a senior fellow at Stanford University's Hoover Institution and co-editor of the influential Quarterly Journal of Economics.

== Academic career ==
Barro graduated with a B.S. in physics from the California Institute of Technology in 1965, where he was a student of Richard Feynman, but he realized he "wouldn't be close to the top in those fields." He then turned to economics and earned a Ph.D. from Harvard University in 1970. He first reached wide notice with a 1974 paper, "Are Government Bonds Net Wealth?" It argued that under certain assumptions, present governmental borrowing would be matched by increased bequests to future generations to pay future taxes expected to pay down the government bonds; thus a lowering of current taxes, financed by the issuance of government bonds, would have no effect on the public's spending on consumer goods. The paper was in direct response to Alan Blinder and Robert Solow's results, which had implied that the long term implications of government borrowing would be compensated for by the wealth effect. The paper is among the most cited in macroeconomics. Its implications of his Ricardian equivalence are still being debated.

Barro collaborated with Herschel Grossman to produce the influential 1971 article "A General Disequilibrium Model of Income and Employment", which for many years held the distinction of being the most cited article published in the American Economic Review. The article explored the idea that disequilibrium in one market can have spillover effects to another market, creating a distinction between notional demand and effective demand. Barro and Grossman expanded on their work and produced the classic textbook Money, Employment, and Inflation in 1976.

In 1976, he authored another influential paper, "Rational expectations and the role of monetary policy" in which he argued that information asymmetries would cause real effects as rational economic actors in response to uncertainty but not in response to expected monetary policy changes. In it and other essays, he investigated the real effects of monetary changes through which he could significantly contribute to the clarification of the exact circumstances of the validity of the policy-ineffectiveness proposition. While he has revisited the topic since then and critically appraised the paper, it was important in integrating the role of money into neoclassical economics and into the synthesis of general equilibrium and macroeconomic models.

In 1983, he applied the information asymmetry argument to the role of central banks and concluded that central banks, to have credibility in inflation fighting, must be locked into inflation targets that they cannot violate to reduce unemployment. In the 1970s, economist Arthur Okun developed the concept of the Misery Index, which Jimmy Carter publicized during his 1976 presidential campaign, and Ronald Reagan did the same in his 1980 presidential campaign. Numerous sources incorrectly credit Barro with this because of the similarity of name with his own "Barro Misery Index." Barro's version first appeared in a 1999 BusinessWeek article.

His 1984 Macroeconomics textbook remains a standard for explaining the subject, and his 1995 book, with Columbia University economist Xavier Sala-i-Martin, on Economic Growth, is a widely cited and read graduate-level textbook on the theory and evidence concerning long-run economic growth. Barro's research in the 1990s was focused mainly on the theoretical and empirical determinants of growth: he gave fundamental contributions to the theory of endogenous growth, with particular attention to the links between innovation and public investment on one side and growth on the other side. He was a pioneer in the econometric analysis of the main factors associated with growth in the modern era.

Barro served as Vice President of the American Economic Association in 1998, and served on its executive committee from 1987 to 1990. He has been a research associate at the NBER since 1978. He was elected a Fellow of the Econometric Society in 1980, and was elected to the American Academy of Arts and Sciences in 1988.

Another often-cited work is a 1988 paper that he coauthored with Gary Becker, "A Reformulation of the Economic Theory of Fertility" published in the Quarterly Journal of Economics, which is influential in thinking about "infinite time horizon" modelling.

Subsequently, Barro began investigating the influence of religion and popular culture on political economy by working with his wife, Rachel McCleary.

Barro believes that the Keynesian multiplier is close to zero. He believes that for every dollar the government borrows and spends, spending elsewhere in the economy falls by almost the same amount.

Barro's work has been central to many of the economic and public policy debates of the last 30 years, including business cycle theory, growth theory, the neoclassical synthesis and public policy. Barro received an honorary doctorate from Universidad Francisco Marroquin. The Research Papers in Economics (RePEc) project ranked him as the fifth most influential economist in the world, as of March 2016, based on his academic contributions.

Finally, Barro has been an outspoken opponent of stimulus spending, calling Obama's stimulus bill "garbage" and "the worst bill since the 1930s."

== Personal life ==
Robert Barro is married to Rachel McCleary. Together they have made critical contributions to the field of religion and economics. McCleary holds a doctorate from the University of Chicago and teaches at Harvard. Barro has four children: Jennifer, Lisa, Jason, and Josh, who is a journalist.

== Selected bibliography ==
=== Books ===
- Barro, Robert J. (1984). Macroeconomics. New York: Wiley. ISBN 978-0-471-87407-2.
- Barro, Robert J.; Sala-i-Martin, Xavier (2003). Economic growth (2nd ed.). Massachusetts: MIT Press. ISBN 978-0-262-02553-9.
- Barro, Robert J.; Chu, Angus C.; Cozzi, Guido. (2017) Intermediate Macroeconomics. Cheriton House, North Way, UK: Cengage Learning EMEA. ISBN 978-1-4737-2509-6.

=== Articles ===
- Barro, Robert J. (November 1974). "Are government bonds net wealth?" (PDF). Journal of Political Economy. 82 (6): 1095–1117. doi:10.1086/260266. JSTOR 1830663. S2CID 154705295.
- Barro, Robert J. (1976). "Rational expectations and the role of monetary policy". Journal of Monetary Economics. 2 (1): 1–32. doi:10.1016/0304-3932(76)90002-7.
- Barro, Robert J. (June 20, 1986). "The left and democracy: Recent debates in Latin America". Telos. 1986 (68): 49–70. doi:10.3817/0686068049. S2CID 147265665.
- Barro, Robert J.; Becker, Gary S. (1988). "A reformulation of the economic theory of fertility". Quarterly Journal of Economics. 103 (1): 1–25. doi:10.2307/1882640. JSTOR 1882640. PMID 11617986.
- Barro, Robert J. (May 1991). "Economic growth in a cross section of countries". Quarterly Journal of Economics. 106 (2): 407–443. doi:10.2307/2937943. JSTOR 2937943.
- Barro, Robert J. (March 2000). "Inequality and growth in a panel of countries". Journal of Economic Growth. 5 (1): 5–32. doi:10.1023/A:1009850119329. S2CID 2089406.
- Barro, Robert J.; Redlick, Charles J. (2011). "Macroeconomic effects from government purchases and taxes". Quarterly Journal of Economics. 126 (1): 51–102. doi:10.1093/qje/qjq002. S2CID 16036052.
