= Edmond Malinvaud =

French economist

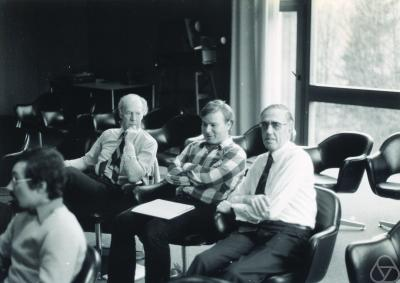
- Edmond Malinvaud (right), next to Yves Balasko (center) and Gérard Debreu, in 1977
- Born: 25 April 1923; Limoges, France
- Died: 7 March 2015 (aged 91); Paris, France

Academic background
- Education: Ecole Polytechnique
- Influences: Léon Walras; Maurice Allais

Academic work
- Discipline: Macroeconomics
- School or tradition: Walrasian economics
- Institutions: Collège de France

Edmond Malinvaud (25 April 1923 – 7 March 2015) was a French economist. He was the first president of the Pontifical Academy of Social Sciences.

Trained at the École Polytechnique and at the École Nationale de la Statistique et de l'Administration Économique (ENSAE) in Paris, Malinvaud was a student of Maurice Allais. In 1950, Malinvaud left Allais to join the Cowles Commission in the United States. At Cowles, Malinvaud produced work in many directions. His famous article, "Capital Accumulation and the Efficient Allocation of Resources" (1953), provided an intertemporal theory of capital for general equilibrium theory and introduced the concept of dynamic efficiency. He became director of the ENSAE (1962–1966), director of the forecast department of French Treasury (1972–1974), director of the INSEE (1974–1987) and Professor at the Collège de France (1988–1993).

He also worked on uncertainty theory, notably the theory of "first order certainty equivalence" (1969) and the relationship between individual risks and social risks (1972, 1973). His microeconomics textbook (Lectures in microeconomic theory) and his econometrics textbook, Statistical Methods in Econometrics, have since become classics.

Malinvaud's main contribution to macroeconomics is represented in his slim 1977 book, Theory of Unemployment Reconsidered which provided a clear and unified reconstruction of dynamic "disequilibrium" macroeconomics; this theory built on previous results of Clower, Leijonhufvud, and "Non-Walrasian" theory. Malinvaud's influence on the subsequent generation of European economists has been profound.

== Major works of Edmond Malinvaud ==
- "Note on von Neumann-Morgenstern's Strong Independence Axiom", 1952, Econometrica.
- "Capital Accumulation and the Efficient Allocation of Resources", 1953, Econometrica
- "Aggregation Problems in Input-Output Models", 1954, in Barna, editor, Structural Interdependence of the Economy
- "Initiation à la comptabilité nationale", 1957
- "Statistical Methods of Econometrics", 1964
- "Croissances optimales dans un modèle macroéconomique", 1965, PASSV.
- "Les Croissances optimales", 1965, Cahiers du séminaire d'économétrie.
- "Decentralized Procedures for Planning", 1967, in Malinvaud and Bacharach, editors, Activity Analysis of Growth and Planning
- "Décisions en face de l'aléatoire et situation certaine approximativement équivalente", 1969, Cahiers du séminaire de la Société d'économetrie
- "First Order Certainty Equivalence", 1969, Econometrica
- "Procédures pour la détermination d'un programme de consommation collective", 1971, European ER.
- "A Planning Approach to the Public Goods Problem", 1971, Swedish JE.
- "Lectures on Microeconomic Theory", 1972.
- "The Allocation of Individual Risks in Large Markets", 1972, JET
- "Prices for Individual Consumption, Quantity Indicators for Collective Consumption", 1972, RES
- "La croissance française", with J.-J. Carré and P. Dubois, 1972.
- "Market for an Exchange Economy with Individual Risks", 1973, Econometrica
- "The Allocation of Individual Risks in Large Markets", 1974, in Dreze, editor, Allocation Under Uncertainty.
- Malinvaud, Edmond (1977). The Theory of Unemployment Reconsidered. Yrjö Jahnsson lectures. Oxford, England: Blackwell. ISBN 0-631-17350-1. LCCN 77367079. OCLC 3362102.
- "Une Nouvelle formulation générale pour l'étude de certains fondements microéconomiques de la macroéconomie", with Y.Younes, 1977, Cahiers du séminaire d'économétrie.
- "Some New Concepts for the Microeconomic Foundations of Macroeconomics" with Y.Younes, 1977, in Harcourt, editor, Microeconomic Foundations of Macroeconomics.
- "Macroeconomic Rationing of Employment", 1980, in Malinvaud and Fitoussi, editors, Unemployment in Western Countries.
- "Profitability and Unemployment", 1980.
- "Théorie macroéconomique", 2 volumes, 1981–2.
- "Essais sur la théorie du chômage", 1983
- "Mass Unemployment", 1984
- "Reflecting on the Theory of Capital and Growth", 1986, Oxford EP
- "The Challenge of Macroeconomic Understanding", 1987, BNLQR.
- "Voies de la recherche macroéconomique", 1991
- "Équilibre général dans les économies de marché", 1993.

== Resources on E. Malinvaud ==
- HET Pages: Malinvaud, Individual and Social Risks, Neo-Walrasian Capital Theory, Disequilibrium Macroeconomics
