= Wealth effect =

Change in spending associated with perceived wealth

The wealth effect is the change in spending that accompanies a change in perceived wealth. Usually, the wealth effect is positive: spending changes in the same direction as perceived wealth.

== Effect on individuals ==
Changes in a consumer's wealth cause changes in the amounts and distribution of their consumption. People typically spend more overall when one of two things is true: when people actually are richer, objectively, or when people perceive themselves to be richer—for example, the assessed value of their home increases, or a stock they own goes up in price.

Demand for some goods (called inferior goods) decreases with increasing wealth. For example, consider the consumption of cheap fast food versus steak. As someone becomes wealthier, their demand for cheap fast food is likely to decrease, and their demand for more expensive steak may increase.

Consumption may be tied to relative wealth. Particularly when supply is highly inelastic, or the seller is a monopoly, one's ability to purchase a good may be closely related to one's relative wealth in the economy. Consider, for example, the cost of real estate in a city with high average wealth (for example, New York or London), in comparison to a city with a low average wealth. Supply is fairly inelastic, so if a helicopter drop (or gold rush) were to suddenly create large amounts of wealth in the low wealth city, those who did not receive this new wealth would rapidly find themselves crowded out of such markets, and materially worse off in terms of their ability to consume/purchase real estate (despite having participated in a weak Pareto improvement). In such situations, one cannot dismiss the relative effect of wealth on demand and supply, and cannot assume that these are static (see also General equilibrium).

However, according to David Backus, the wealth effect is not observable in economic data, at least with respect to changes in home or stock equity. For example, while the stock market boom in the late 1990s (caused by the dot-com bubble) increased the wealth of Americans, it did not produce a significant change in consumption, and after the crash, consumption did not decrease.

Economist Dean Baker disagrees, saying that the "housing wealth effect" is well known and a standard part of economic theory and modeling, and that economists expect households to consume based on their wealth. He cites approvingly research done by Carroll and Zhou that estimates that households increase their annual consumption by 6 cents for every additional dollar of home equity.

== In macroeconomics ==
In macroeconomics, a rise in real wealth increases consumption, shifting the IS curve out to the right, thus pushing up interest rates and increasing aggregate demand. A decrease in real wealth has the opposite effect.

== See also ==
- Income effect
- Income elasticity of demand
- Money illusion
- Ricardian equivalence
- Wealth (economics)
- Wealth elasticity of demand
