= Robert W. Clower =

American economist (1926-2011)

- Born: Robert Wayne Clower; February 13, 1926; Pullman, Washington, USA
- Died: May 2, 2011 (aged 85); Columbia, South Carolina, USA

Academic background
- Education: Washington State University; University of Oxford
- Doctoral advisor: John Hicks

Academic work
- Institutions: Washington State University; Northwestern University; UCLA; University of South Carolina
- Doctoral students: Axel Leijonhufvud; Peter Howitt

Robert Wayne Clower (February 13, 1926 – May 2, 2011) was an American economist. He is credited with having largely created the field of stock-flow analysis in economics and with seminal works on the microfoundations of monetary theory and macroeconomics.

== Major contributions ==
Clower is credited with having largely created the field of stock-flow analysis in economics.

In seminal papers that advanced strong methodological positions and set an agenda for subsequent research, Clower formalized and reformulated:

- Keynesian theory as disequilibrium analysis in contrast to standard general equilibrium theory, thereby generalizing (or rejecting) Walras' law and standard price theory. To this end, he proposed the 'dual-decision hypothesis' in which realized transaction quantities affect adjustments in output at other than full-employment equilibrium but not at full-employment equilibrium. This, he argued, was implicit in Keynes's work to explain how full-employment equilibrium is only a special case. Such quantity constraints introduce nonlinearities that complicate dynamic stability of the economic system as to full-employment equilibrium and require a distinction between notional and effective demand.
- Monetary theory to incorporate explicitly the difference between a money economy and barter economy such that "in sharp contrast with established [microeconomic] theory, money commodities play a peculiar and central role in shaping prevailing forces of excess demand." It is here that his cash-in-advance constraint, now often referred to as the Clower constraint was introduced.

== Early life and professional positions ==
Robert Clower grew up in Pullman, Washington, where he was born on February 13, 1926. His father, F.W. Clower, was a professor of economics there at Washington State College. After high-school graduation, he joined the army, serving thirty-one months before returning to the U.S. where he enrolled at Washington State in the summer of 1946. He received a B.A. degree in Economics there in 1948 (highest honors). When his father became ill in 1948, he was tapped to fill in for his father's classes, in which he had been enrolled after intense earlier reading. He was promoted to Associate Professor upon his father's death for completion of the term and demoted to Instructor in the next term. He received an M.A. degree there in 1949.

Clower continued postgraduate work as a Rhodes scholar at Oxford University. There, he studied under John R. Hicks and received a B.Litt. degree in 1952. On re-examination, he was awarded a Doctor of Letters degree in 1978.

Subsequent positions as a professor of economics or administrator included:

- Washington State College (later, University), 1952–1957
- University of Punjab, Lahore, West Pakistan, 1954–1956
- Northwestern University, 1958–1971, also department Chairman, 1958–65
- Director, Economic Survey of Liberia, 1961–1962
- Makerere College, Kampala, Uganda, 1965, Summer
- University of Essex 1965–1966, 1968–1969, the latter also Dean, School of Social Studies
- UCLA, 1971–1986, Professor Emeritus, 1987-2011
- Washington State University, 1978–1980, Adjunct Professor
- University of South Carolina, 1986–2001; Distinguished Professor Emeritus, 2001-.

Other responsibilities included:

- Managing Editor, Economic Inquiry, 1973–1979
- Editor, American Economic Review, 1981-85
- President, Western Economic Association, 1987.
- President, Southern Economic Association, 1992-93.

Clower was a Fellow of the Econometric Society. He died in 2011 at Columbia, South Carolina.

== See also ==
- Disequilibrium macroeconomics
- Monetary-disequilibrium theory
- Neo-Keynesian economics

== Selected publications of Robert W. Clower ==
- 1954a. "An Investigation into the Dynamics of Investment," American Economic Review. 44(l), pp. 64-81.
- 1954b. "Price Determination in a Stock-Flow Economy" with D. W. Bushaw, Econometrica 22(3), pp. 328-343.
- 1957. Introduction to Mathematical Economics, with D.W. Bushaw. Chapter ("Section") and arrow-searchable page links.
- 1960. "On the Invariance of Demand for Cash and Other Assets," with M.L. Burstein, Review of Economic Studies, 28(1), pp. 32-36.
- 1964. "Monetary History and Positive Economics," Journal of Economic History, 24(3), pp. 364-380
- 1965. "The Keynesian Counter-Revolution: A Theoretical Appraisal," in F.H. Hahn and F.P.R. Brechling, ed., The Theory of Interest Rates. Macmillan. Reprinted in Clower, 1987, pp. 34-58.
- 1966. Growth without Development: An Economic Survey of Liberia, with George Dalton, Mitchell Harwitz, and Alan A. Walters. Review extracts 1 and 2.
- 1967. "A Reconsideration of the Microfoundations of Monetary Theory," Western Economic Journal, 6(1), pp. 1-8 (press +).
- 1968. "Stock-flow analysis," International Encyclopedia of the Social Sciences, v. 12.
- 1969a. Editor, Monetary Theory: Selected Readings, Hammondsworth, Penguin.
- 1969b. "What Traditional Monetary Theory Really Wasn't," Canadian Journal of Economics. 2(2), pp. 299-302.
- 1973. "Say's Principle: What It Means and Doesn't Mean," with A. Leijonhufvud, Intermountain Economic Review.
- 1975a. "Reflections on the Keynesian Perplex," Journal of Economics, 35(1), pp. 1-25.
- 1975b. "The Coordination of Economic Activities: A Keynesian Perspective," with Axel Leijonhufvud, 1975, American Economic Review. 65(2), pp. 182-188 (press +).
- 1977. "The Anatomy of Monetary Theory," American Economic Review, 67(1), pp. 206-212. WP.
- 1978. "The Transactions Theory of the Demand for Money: A Reconsideration", with Peter W. Howitt, 86(3), pp. 449-466 (press +).
- 1987. Money and Markets, D.A. Walker, ed. Cambridge. Description and chapter-preview links. Review extract of David Laidler.
- 1988. "The Ideas of Economists," in A. Klamer, D.N. McCloskey, and R.M. Solow, ed., The Consequences of Economic Rhetoric, Cambridge. pp. 85-98.
- 1989. "How Economists Think," Business and Economic Review, 36(1), pp. 9–17. Reprinted in 1995c.
- 1994. "Economics as an Inductive Science," Southern Economic Journal, 60(4), pp. 805-814 (press +). Presidential address, SEA.
- 1995a. "Axiomatics in Economics," Southern Economic Journal, 62(2), pp. 307-319(press +).
- 1995b. "On the Origin of Monetary Exchange," Economic Inquiry, 33(4), pp. 525–36. Abstract and reprint.
- 1995c. Economic Doctrine and Method: Selected Papers of R.W. Clower, Edward Elgar Publishing. Description.
- 1996. "Taking Markets Seriously: Groundwork for a Post-Walrasian Macroeconomics", with P.W. Howitt, in David Colander, ed., Beyond Microfoundations, pp. 21-37.
- 1999. The Emergence of Economic Organization - co-author Peter Howitt (economist)
- 1999. "Robert W. Clower," in Brian Snowdon and Howard R. Vane, Conversations with Leading Economists: Interpreting Modern Macroeconomics, ch. 6, pp. 177-91.
- 2000. "The Emergence of Economic Organization," with Peter Howitt, Journal of Economic Behavior & Organization, 41(1), pp. 55-84 (select page and press +).
