= Don Patinkin =

Israeli-American economist and university administrator

- דן פטינקין
- Born: January 8, 1922; Chicago, Illinois, US
- Died: August 7, 1995 (aged 73); Jerusalem, Israel

Academic background
- Education: University of Chicago
- Influences: Oskar Lange; Frank Knight; John Maynard Keynes; Knut Wicksell

Academic work
- Discipline: Monetary economics
- School or tradition: Neo-Keynesian economics
- Institutions: Hebrew University of Jerusalem

Don Patinkin (Hebrew: דן פטינקין; January 8, 1922 – August 7, 1995) was an American-born Israeli monetary economist, and the President of the Hebrew University of Jerusalem.

== Biography ==
Don Patinkin was born January 8, 1922, in Chicago, to a family of Jewish emigrants from Poland. While doing his undergraduate studies at the University of Chicago, he also studied the Talmud at the Hebrew Theological College in Chicago. He continued at Chicago for his graduate studies, earning a Ph.D. in 1947 under the supervision of Oskar R. Lange. Patinkin was a strong Zionist and, while doing his graduate studies, planned to immigrate to Palestine; in his graduate research he studied Palestinian economics, although he did not complete his thesis in this subject.

After graduating he held lecturer positions at the University of Chicago and the University of Illinois until he succeeded in emigrating to Israel in 1949, where he was hired by the Hebrew University in Jerusalem. In 1956 he was appointed the research director of the Falk Institute for Economic Research, which was established by Simon Kuznetz with the support of the Falk Foundation.

== Academic career ==
He remained at the Hebrew University. becoming university president from 1982 to 1986, following Avraham Harman. He resigned due to the poor state of the university's finances and was succeeded by Amnon Pazy. He retired in 1989, and died August 7, 1995, in Jerusalem.

== Economic research ==
Patinkin's work explored some of the microfoundations of Keynesian macroeconomics, particularly the role of money demand. His monograph Money, Interest, and Prices (1956) was for many years one of the most widely used advanced references on monetary economics.

Huw Dixon believes that: "Money, Interest and Prices is perhaps as great in its vision as Keynes' General Theory. Whilst the latter has a greater abundance of originality, the former has a greater clarity of insight and formal expression. Don Patinkin states his theory of the labour market and corresponding notion of the full employment equilibrium in just three pages of Money, Interest and Prices (in the 1965 edn. pp. 127–30). These pages deserve great attention: they state the labour market model that became the standard foundation for the aggregate supply curve in the aggregate demand/aggregate supply (AD/AS) model. Although Patinkin himself did not formulate the AD/AS representation, it is implicit in his Money, Interest and Prices."

== Published works ==
- "Mercantilism and the Readmission of Jews in England", 1946, Jewish Social Studies
- "Multiple-Plant Firms, Cartels and Imperfect Competition", 1947, QJE.
- "Relative Prices, Say's Law, and the Demand for Money", 1948, Econometrica.
- "Price Flexibility and Full Employment", 1948, AER.
- "The Indeterminacy of Absolute Prices in Classical Economic Theory", 1949, Econometrica.
- "Involuntary Unemployment and the Keynesian Supply Function", 1949, EJ.
- "A Reconsideration of the General Equilibrium Theory of Money", 1950, RES.
- "The Invalidity of Classical Monetary Theory", 1951, Econometrica.
- "Further Considerations of the General Equilibrium Theory of Money", 1951, RES.
- "The Limitations of Samuelson's `Correspondence Principle'", 1952, Metroeconomica.
- "Wicksell's `Cumulative Process'", 1952, EJ.
- "Dichotomies of the Pricing Process in Economic Theory", 1954, Economica.
- "Keynesian Economics and the Quantity Theory", 1954, in Kurihara, editor, Post-Keynesian Economics.
- "Monetary and Price Developments in Israel", 1955, Scripta Hierosolymitana.
- Money, Interest and Prices: An Integration of Monetary and Value Theory, 1956.
- "Liquidity Preference and Loanable Funds: Stock and Flow Analysis", 1958, Economica.
- "Secular Price Movements and Economic Development: Some Theoretical Aspects", in Bonne, editor, The Challenge of Development.
- The Israel Economy: The First Decade, 1959.
- "Keynes and Econometrics: On the Interaction of the Macroeconomic Revolutions of the Interwar Period", 1976, Econometrica.

== Awards and recognition ==
Patinkin was awarded the Israel Prize in 1970. In 1989, a conference was held in honor of Patinkin's retirement.

== See also ==
- List of Israel Prize recipients
- Disequilibrium macroeconomics
