= Wealth =

Abundance of financial assets or possessions

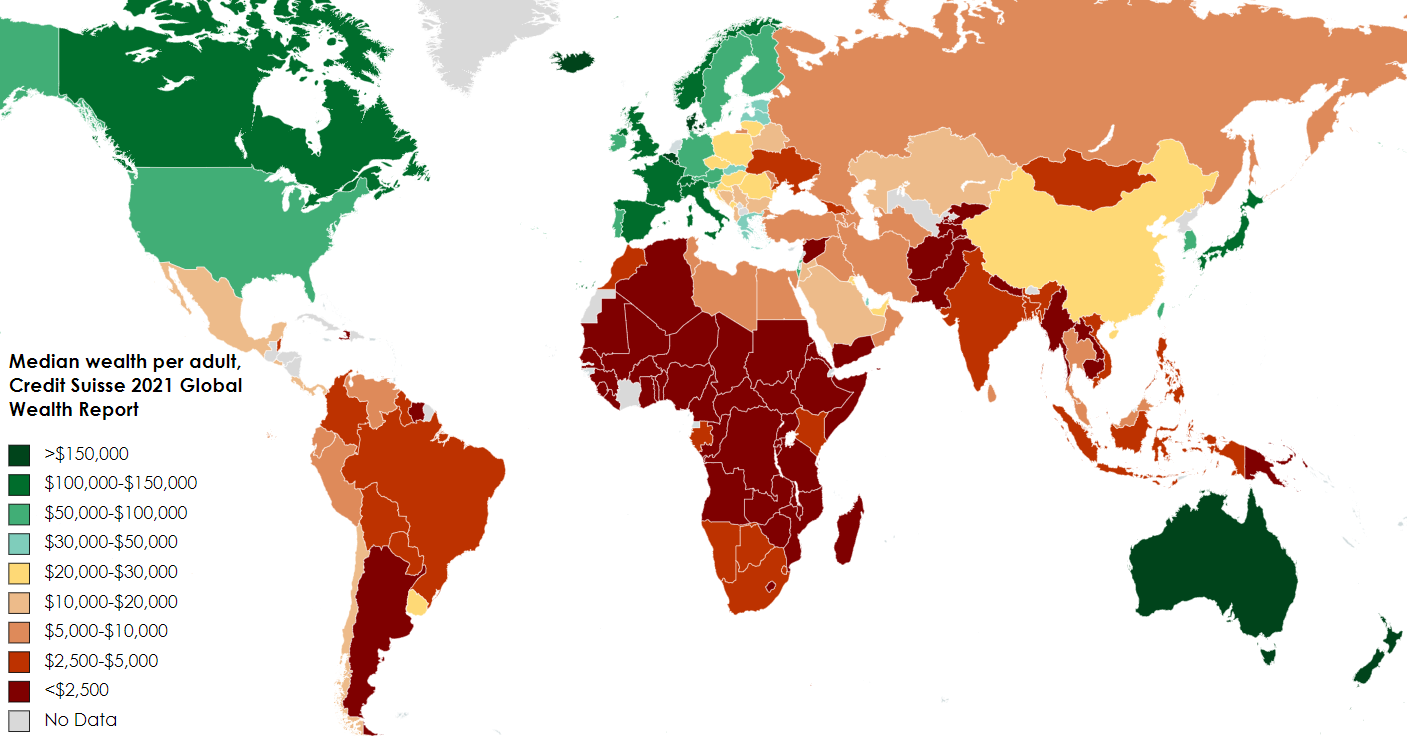
Countries by median wealth per adult (US dollars); source: Credit Suisse

Wealth is the abundance of valuable financial assets or physical possessions which can be converted into a form that can be used for transactions. This includes the core meaning as held in the originating Old English word weal, which is from the Indo-European word stem, wel-, meaning "to wish" or "good". The modern concept of wealth is of significance in all areas of economics, and clearly so for growth economics and development economics, yet the meaning of wealth is context-dependent. A person possessing a substantial net worth is known as wealthy. Net worth is defined as the current value of one's assets less liabilities (excluding the principal in trust accounts).

At the most general level, economists may define wealth as "the total of anything of value" that captures both the subjective nature of the idea and the idea that it is not a fixed or static concept. Various definitions and concepts of wealth have been asserted by various people in different contexts. Defining wealth can be a normative process with various ethical implications, since often wealth maximization is seen as a goal or is thought to be a normative principle of its own. A community, region or country that possesses an abundance of such possessions or resources for the benefit of the common good is known as wealthy.

The United Nations definition of inclusive wealth is a monetary measure which includes the sum of natural, human, and physical assets. Natural capital includes land, forests, energy resources, and minerals. Human capital is the population's education and skills. Physical (or "manufactured") capital includes such things as machinery, buildings, and infrastructure.

== History ==
Around 35,000 years ago Homo sapiens groups began to adopt a more settled lifestyle, as evidenced by cave drawings, burial sites, and decorative objects. Around this time, humans began trading burial-site tools and developed trade networks, resulting in a hunter-gatherer lifestyle. Those who had gathered abundant burial-site tools, weapons, baskets, and food, were considered part of the wealthy.

Adam Smith, in his seminal work The Wealth of Nations, described wealth as "the annual produce of the land and labor of the society". This "produce" is, at its simplest, a good or service which satisfies human needs, and wants of utility.

In popular usage, wealth can be described as the abundance of items of economic value, or the state of controlling or possessing such items — usually in the form of money, real estate and/or personal property. A person considered wealthy, affluent, or rich is someone who has accumulated substantial wealth relative to others in their society or reference group.

In economics, net worth refers to the value of assets owned minus the value of liabilities owed at a point in time. Wealth can be categorized into three principal categories: personal property, including homes or automobiles; monetary savings, such as the accumulation of past income; and the capital wealth of income producing assets, including real estate, stocks, bonds, and businesses. All these delineations make wealth an especially important part of social stratification. Wealth provides some people "safety nets" of protection against unforeseen declines in their living standard in the event of emergency and can be transformed into home ownership, business ownership, or college education by its expenditure.

Wealth has been defined as a collection of things limited in supply, transferable, and useful in satisfying human desires. Scarcity is a fundamental factor for wealth. When a desirable or valuable commodity (transferable good or skill) is abundantly available to everyone, the owner of the commodity will possess no potential for wealth. When a valuable or desirable commodity is in scarce supply, the owner of the commodity will possess great potential for wealth.

'Wealth' refers to some accumulation of resources (net asset value), whether abundant or not. 'Richness' refers to an abundance of such resources (income or flow). A wealthy person, group, or nation thus has more accumulated resources (capital) than a poor one. The opposite of wealth is destitution. The opposite of richness is poverty.

The term implies a social contract on establishing and maintaining ownership in relation to such items which can be invoked with little or no effort and expense on the part of the owner. The concept of wealth is relative and not only varies between societies, but varies between different sections or regions in the same society. A personal net worth of US$10,000 in most parts of the United States would certainly not place a person among the wealthiest citizens of that locale. Such an amount would constitute an extraordinary amount of wealth in impoverished developing countries.

Concepts of wealth also vary across time. Modern labor-saving inventions and the development of the sciences have vastly improved the standard of living in modern societies for even the poorest of people. This comparative wealth across time is also applicable to the future; given this trend of human advancement, it is possible that the standard of living that the wealthiest enjoy today will be considered impoverished by future generations.

Industrialization emphasized the role of technology. Many jobs were automated. Machines replaced some workers while other workers became more specialized. Labour specialization became critical to economic success. Physical capital, as it came to be known, consisting of both the natural capital and the infrastructural capital, became the focus of the analysis of wealth.

Adam Smith saw wealth creation as the combination of materials, labour, land, and technology. The theories of David Ricardo, John Locke, John Stuart Mill, in the 18th century and 19th century built on these views of wealth that we now call classical economics.

Marxian economics (see labor theory of value) distinguishes in the Grundrisse between material wealth and human wealth, defining human wealth as "wealth in human relations"; land and labour were the source of all material wealth. The German cultural historian Silvio Vietta links wealth/poverty to rationality. Having a leading position in the development of rational sciences, in new technologies and in economic production leads to wealth, while the opposite can be correlated with poverty.

== Global amount ==
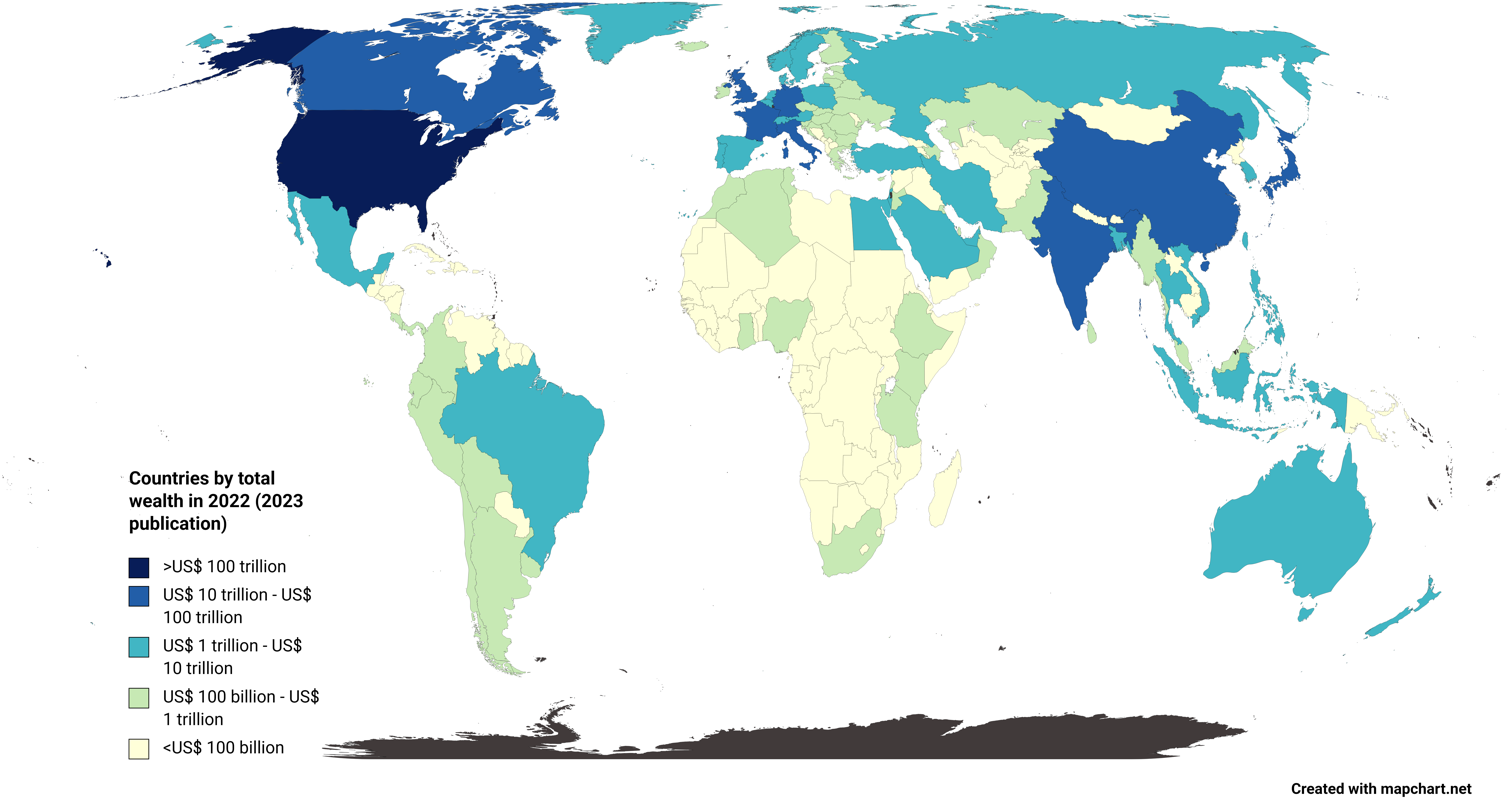
Countries by total wealth (trillions USD), Credit Suisse

The wealth of households worldwide amounts to US$280 trillion (2017). According to the eighth edition of the Global Wealth Report, in the year to mid-2017, total global wealth rose at a rate of 6.4%, the fastest pace since 2012 and reached US$280 trillion, a gain of US$16.7 trillion. This reflected widespread gains in equity markets matched by similar rises in non-financial assets, which moved above the pre-crisis year 2007's level for the first time this year. Wealth growth also outpaced population growth, so that global mean wealth per adult grew by 4.9% and reached a new record high of US$56,540 per adult. Tim Harford has asserted that a small child has greater wealth than the 2 billion poorest people in the world combined, since a small child has no debt.

According to the 2021 global wealth report by McKinsey & Company, the worldwide total net worth was US$514 trillion in 2020, with China being the wealthiest nation with net worth of US$120 trillion. Another report, by Credit Suisse in 2021, suggests the total wealth of the US exceeded that of China, US$126.3 trillion to US$74.9 trillion.

== Philosophical analysis ==
In Western civilization, wealth is connected with a quantitative type of thought or state of mind, invented in the ancient Greek "revolution of rationality", involving for instance the quantitative analysis of nature, the rationalization of warfare, and measurement in economics. For example, Stoic philosopher Epictetus, himself a former slave, states that "wealth consists not in great possessions, but in having few wants." On the other hand, Epicurus, founder of Epicureanism, agrees that true wealth is not the accumulation of possessions, however diverges from Stoicism and argues that true wealth is found in self-sufficiency and moderation.

The invention of coined money and banking was particularly important. Aristotle describes the basic function of money as a universal instrument of quantitative measurement – "for it measures all things" – making things alike and comparable due to a social "agreement" of acceptance. In that way, money also enables a new type of economic society and the definition of wealth in measurable quantities, such as gold and money.

Modern philosophers like Nietzsche criticized the fixation on measurable wealth: "Unsere 'Reichen' – das sind die Ärmsten! Der eigentliche Zweck alles Reichtums ist vergessen!" ("Our 'rich people' – those are the poorest! The real purpose of all wealth has been forgotten!"). Nietzsche intended to communicate that true wealth is obtained in the spirit and in intellect, not in the possession of material objects. Moreover, material wealth has increasingly been associated with mental wellbeing & intelligence over time; in fact, wealth gaps may explain economic disparities that then result in differing levels of mental wellbeing.

In his best-seller Rich Dad Poor Dad, Japanese-American entrepreneur Robert Kiyosaki writes that emotions, especially fear and greed, forever control people's financial decisions, and thereby their lives. He also emphasises on working to learn new skills — such as sales, marketing, investing, and communication — rather than working to earn more money as one of the book's 6 core lessons, linking to Nietzsche's statement on materially wealthy people.

== Economic analysis ==
In economics, wealth (in a commonly applied accounting sense, sometimes savings) is the net worth of a person, household, or nation – that is, the value of all assets owned net of all liabilities owed at a point in time. For national wealth as measured in the national accounts, the net liabilities are those owed to the rest of the world. The term may also be used more broadly as referring to the productive capacity of a society or as a contrast to poverty. Analytical emphasis may be on its determinants or distribution.

Economic terminology distinguishes between wealth and income. Wealth or savings is a stock variable – that is, it is measurable at a date in time, for example the value of an orchard on December 31 minus debt owed on the orchard. For a given amount of wealth, say at the beginning of the year, income from that wealth, as measurable over say a year is a flow variable. What marks the income as a flow is its measurement per unit of time, such as the value of apples yielded from the orchard per year.

In macroeconomic theory, the 'wealth effect' may refer to the increase in aggregate consumption from an increase in national wealth. One feature of its effect on economic behavior is the wealth elasticity of demand, which is the percentage change in the amount of consumption goods demanded for each one-percent change in wealth.

There are several historical developmental economics points of view on the basis of wealth, such as from Principles of Political Economy by John Stuart Mill, The Wealth of Nations by Adam Smith, Capital by Karl Marx, etc. Over the history, some of the key underlying factors in wealth creation and the measurement of the wealth include the scalable innovation and application of human knowledge in the form of institutional structure and political/ideological "superstructure", the scarce resources (both natural and man-made), and the saving of monetary assets.

In classical economics, the division of labor, capital, accumulation, and improvements in the productive powers of labour are seen as central drivers of a nation's wealth, first identified by Adam Smith in The Wealth of Nations. These factors operate most effectively under the "obvious and simple system of natural liberty", supported by a "tolerable administration of justice" that secures property rights so individuals can enjoy the fruits of their own labour and engage in voluntary exchange. Smith argued that individuals pursuing their own interests through competitive markets tend to promote the broader prosperity of society. John Stuart Mill, in Principles of Political Economy, similarly emphasized that productivity is enhanced by legal and social institutions that provide security of person and property. Modern interpreters of Smith, such as Douglas A. Irwin, have highlighted that secure property rights form the institutional foundation enabling the division of labour and sustained economic progress.

Wealth may be measured in nominal or real values – that is, in money value as of a given date or adjusted to net out price changes. The assets include those that are tangible (land and capital) and financial (money, bonds, etc.). Measurable wealth typically excludes intangible or nonmarketable assets such as human capital and social capital. In economics, 'wealth' corresponds to the accounting term 'net worth', but is measured differently. Accounting measures net worth in terms of the historical cost of assets while economics measures wealth in terms of current values. But analysis may adapt typical accounting conventions for economic purposes in social accounting (such as in national accounts). An example of the latter is generational accounting of social security systems to include the present value projected future outlays considered to be liabilities. Macroeconomic questions include whether the issuance of government bonds affects investment and consumption through the wealth effect.

Environmental assets are not usually counted in measuring wealth, in part due to the difficulty of valuation for a non-market good. Environmental or green accounting is a method of social accounting for formulating and deriving such measures on the argument that an educated valuation is superior to a value of zero (as the implied valuation of environmental assets).

== Versus social class ==
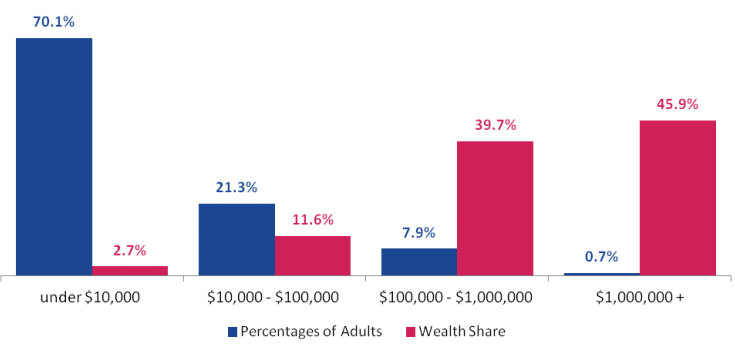
Global share of wealth by wealth group, Credit Suisse, 2017

Social class is not identical to wealth, but the two concepts are related (particularly in Marxist theory), leading to the concept of socioeconomic status. Wealth at the individual or household level refers to value of everything a person or family owns, including personal property and financial assets.

In both Marxist and Weberian theory, class is divided into upper and lower, with each further subdivided. Capitalist economic classes also typically include middle classes with subdivisions (e.g., upper middle class).

The upper class are schooled to maintain their wealth and pass it to future generations.

The middle class views wealth as something for emergencies and it is seen as more of a cushion. This class comprises people that were raised with families that typically owned their own home, planned ahead and stressed the importance of education and achievement. They earn a significant income and consume many things, typically limiting their savings and investments to retirement pensions and home ownership. Below the middle class, the working class and poor have the least amount of wealth, with circumstances discouraging accumulation of assets.

== Distribution ==
Though the 10th percentile of American households have zero net worth, the 90th percentile has $1.8 million of household wealth.

Higher educational attainment in the US corresponds with median household wealth.

Median wealth of married couples exceeds that of single individuals, regardless of gender and across all age categories.

Transaction accounts are those with immediate "on-demand" access. Average account values are skewed upward by a small number of high-balance accounts. Median balances in transaction accounts better indicate readily available funds.

Although precise data are not available, the total household wealth in the world, excluding the value of human capital, has been estimated at US$418.3 trillion at the end of the year 2020. For 2018, the World Bank estimated the value of the world's produced capital, natural capital, and human capital to be $1,152 trillion. According to the Kuznets curve, inequality of wealth and income increases during the early phases of economic development, stabilizes and then becomes more equitable.

As of 2008, about 90% of global wealth is distributed in North America, Europe, and "rich Asia-Pacific" countries, and in 2008, 1% of adults were estimated to hold 40% of world wealth, a number which falls to 32% when adjusted for purchasing power parity. According to Richard H Ropers, the concentration of wealth in the United States is "inequitably distributed". For example, the number of millionaires in the USA is more than 23.6 million as of 2026; for reference, there are more than 342 million people in the USA, meaning millionaires comprise of about 7% of the country's population.

In 2013, 1% of adults were estimated to hold 46% of world wealth and around $18.5 trillion was estimated to be stored in tax havens worldwide. A fraction of adults have negative net worth, where debt is higher than assets.

== See also ==
- Economic security
- Financial literacy
- Gross National Happiness
- Happiness economics
- List of countries by gross national savings
- Productivity-improving technologies
- Quality of life
- Saving
- Working time
