= Neoclassical synthesis =

Postwar academic movement in economics

The neoclassical synthesis (NCS), or neoclassical–Keynesian synthesis, is an academic movement and paradigm in economics that worked towards reconciling the macroeconomic thought of John Maynard Keynes in his book The General Theory of Employment, Interest and Money (1936) with neoclassical economics.

The neoclassical synthesis is a macroeconomic theory that emerged in the mid-20th century, combining the ideas of neoclassical economics with Keynesian economics. The synthesis was an attempt to reconcile the apparent differences between the two schools of thought and create a more comprehensive theory of macroeconomics.

It was formulated most notably by John Hicks (1937), Franco Modigliani (1944), and Paul Samuelson (1948), who dominated economics in the post-war period and formed the mainstream of macroeconomic thought in the 1950s, 60s, and 70s.

The Keynesian school of economics had gained widespread acceptance during the Great Depression, as governments used deficit spending and monetary policy to stimulate economic activity and reduce unemployment. However, neoclassical economists argued that Keynesian policies could lead to inflation and other economic problems. They believed that markets would eventually adjust to restore equilibrium, and that government intervention could disrupt this process.

In the 1950s and 1960s, economists like Paul Samuelson and Robert Solow developed the neoclassical synthesis, which attempted to reconcile these two schools of thought. The neoclassical synthesis emphasized the role of market forces in the economy, while also acknowledging the need for government intervention in certain circumstances. According to the neoclassical synthesis, the economy operates according to the principles of neoclassical economics in the long run, but in the short run, Keynesian policies can be effective in stimulating economic growth and reducing unemployment. The synthesis also emphasized the importance of monetary policy in controlling inflation and maintaining economic stability. Overall, the neoclassical synthesis was a significant development in the field of macroeconomics, as it brought together two previously competing schools of thought and created a more comprehensive theory of the economy.

A series of developments occurred that shook the neoclassical synthesis in the 1970s as the advent of stagflation and the work of monetarists like Milton Friedman cast doubt on the synthesis' conceptions of monetary theory. The conditions of the period proved the impossibility of maintaining sustainable growth and low level of inflation via the measures suggested by the school. The result would be a series of new ideas to bring tools to macroeconomic analysis that would be capable of explaining the economic events of the 1970s. Subsequent new Keynesian and new classical economists strived to provide macroeconomics with microeconomic foundations, incorporating traditionally Keynesian and neoclassical characteristics respectively. These schools eventually came to form a "new neoclassical synthesis", analogous to the neoclassical one, that currently underpins the mainstream of macroeconomic theory.

== Emergence of the neoclassical synthesis ==
Several of these accounts, taken from Peter Howitt, N. Gregory Mankiw, and Michael Woodford's writings, are presented here for the reader's consideration:

It seemed logical to regard Keynesian theory as relating to short-run fluctuations and general equilibrium theory as applying to long-run difficulties where adjustment problems could be safely neglected because wages were widely believed to be less than totally flexible in the short term. The "neoclassical synthesis" is the name given to this perspective. Since macroeconomics emerged as a distinct field of study, how to reconcile these two economic visions—one founded on Adam Smith's invisible hand and Alfred Marshall's supply and demand curves, the other on Keynes's analysis of an economy suffering from insufficient aggregate demand—has been a profound, nagging question. The 'neoclassical-Keynesian synthesis,' as it is frequently referred to, was supposed to have reconciled these ideas by early Keynesians like Samuelson, Modigliani, and Tobin. These economists thought that while the Keynesian description of the invisible hand may paralyze it in the short run was true, the classical theory of Smith and Marshall was correct in the long run.

After the Great Depression, and particularly in America, the "neoclassical synthesis" became the dominant viewpoint. The neoclassical synthesis suggested that both the Keynesian theory and the neoclassical general equilibrium theory could be seen as true, albeit incomplete, descriptions of economic reality. It was created, among others, in the first decade following Keynes' writing, by John R. Hicks and Paul A. Samuelson.

It was maintained that the traditional theory of general competitive equilibrium, once wages and prices had sufficiently had time to adjust to clear markets, would accurately describe the determination of prices and quantities in the long run. At the same time, it was suggested that the Keynesian model could explain the short-term consequences of both economic disruptions and policy changes, before prices and wages had much time to react. The 'neoclassical synthesis' allowed postwar Keynesians to maintain that there was no fundamental incompatibility between microeconomic and macroeconomic theory. The specifics of how one got from the Keynesian short run to the "classical" long run were not really worked out.

All of these quotes point to the same conclusion: the concern of the neoclassical synthesis is the relationship between the short and long periods, the first of which is the area of study of Keynesian theory because it is characterized by stickiness and market non-clearing, and the latter by flexibility and market clearing. Here, in contrast to Samuelson's statements, the focus is more on theoretical advancements than on a consensus regarding policy.

Macroeconomics had significant advancements between 1940 and 1970; as a result, Blanchard refers to this time as the "golden age" of macroeconomics. Major strides have also been achieved in the analysis of the three behavior functions—consumption, investment, and money demand—that were the basis for the IS-LM model. In an additional effort to quantify the hypotheses derived from theoretical models, macro-econometric models were created. In addition, the Solow neoclassical economic growth model was created at the same time to explore the factors that influence economic growth.

== Empirical developments ==
The IS-LM model, created by Hicks (1937), is a tool for analysis that aims to condense a complex text like the GT into a straightforward model of three markets, one of which is residual. The LM curve depicts the equilibrium in the money market and uses output as an exogenous variable, while the IS curve portrays equilibrium in the goods market using the interest rate as an exogenous variable. Output and interest rate are determined by the junction of the IS and LM.

The existence of an inverse link between the growth rate of nominal wages and the unemployment rate was also discovered by Phillips (1958) as an empirical regularity. Later, it was discovered that this association was caused by the fact that reduced unemployment rates drive increased nominal salaries, which are linked to rising prices since they represent the labor costs of the average business. The idea of expectations on the inflation rate was also introduced as wage negotiations between employers and employees take into consideration agents' inflation expectations. Finally, the idea of the "natural rate of unemployment" was adopted, and recessions and unemployment were seen as passing trends. Thus, aggregate demand and the idea that it may temporarily lower unemployment at the expense of higher inflation prevailed in the Keynesian analysis framework.

These fundamental tools, which combine the IS-LM model with the Phillips curve, made it possible to ascertain the macroeconomist's primary interest variables: output, employment, interest rates, and inflation rates.

There was still a gap after the IS-LM-Phillips curve model became widely accepted as the unit of analysis in macroeconomic theory: putting numbers on variables like the marginal propensity to consume, the propensity to invest, or the sensitivity of money demand to interest rates, so that macroeconomic forecasts could be made or economic policy combinations could be simulated. In other words, they needed to test the key theories deduced from the models. In the early 1950s, Klein of the University of Pennsylvania and Modigliani of MIT were the first to create this task.

The work of Tobin (1969) is exceptional in the study of factors influencing investment because it popularized the "Q Theory" idea, which is based on the expected present value of future capital profits. The q's Tobin ratio measures the difference between the value of capital stock at replacement cost and the cost of acquiring the company on the financial regulated market (the stock market). The business can determine the ideal time to issue shares to finance a new investment project by keeping an eye on the Tobin's Q. If it is higher than 1, their replacement cost is larger than their stock price on the financial market. In order for the business to profitably raise its investment, shares may be issued. Other insights into financial markets have been developed using Tobin's theory as a foundation.

However, in the area of money demand, Tobin(1956) and Baumol (1952) each made a unique contribution from the perspective of an inventory to the theory of money demand. These theories assume that money serves primarily as a means of trade and that bonds serve as a store of value. According to this hypothesis, families decide how to allocate their wealth by holding some in cash and some in various assets that generate interest. This choice is based on risk, performance, and liquidity.

Families must "trade-off" between the return they miss out on and the costs of selling other assets to get the money they need for their transactions. The process of exchanging money for bonds and vice versa is permanent and creates transaction costs. Over the course of a particular period, the family spends a certain amount of money for its expenses. When it runs out, it returns to the bank for an equivalent amount. The demand for money increases as the price rises.

== Macroeconomic principles underlying microeconomics ==
In parallel, significant advancements in the theory of consumption, investment, and liquidity preference were made in specialized journals.

Given that Keynes believed that this variable was only associated with current income, the developments of Friedman (1957), with the theory of consumption based in permanent income, and Modigliani (1954, 1963), with the theory of consumption based on the life cycle hypothesis, represented a significant advance in the study of the determinants of consumption.

According to Friedman's model, an individual plans a steady level of consumption in relation to permanent income, which is defined as the average of current income and future income that the agent anticipates receiving over the course of his lifetime. Despite the uncertainty surrounding future income, the model includes the development of expectations as a crucial component for its application.

In his application proposal, Modigliani puts special attention on how income changes over the course of an agent's life. The person wants to maintain a steady level of consumption, therefore while he is young and has a low income, he typically borrows because he anticipates having larger wages during his productive era of life. The person "dis-saves" when he reaches old age and his income is below his level of consumption expenditures. It is necessary to presuppose the presence of a sophisticated financial system with open access for this system to function.

== Main contributors ==
John Maynard Keynes provided the framework for synthesizing a host of economic ideas present between 1900 and 1940 and that synthesis bears his name, known as Keynesian economics. The first generation of neo-Keynesians was focused on unifying the ideas into workable paradigms, combining them with ideas from classical economics and the writings of Alfred Marshall. Paul Samuelson started the program of neoclassical synthesis, outlining two main objects of study:

1. Static theories: equilibrium is described as a result of actions of rational price-taking agents;
2. Dynamic theories: price adjustments toward equilibrium after shocks realization, with prices moving in the direction of excess demand functions proportionally to the functions' magnitudes.

Much of neo-Keynesian economic theory was developed by leaders of economic profession, such as John Hicks, Maurice Allais, Franco Modigliani, Paul Samuelson, Alvin Hansen, Lawrence Klein, James Tobin and Don Patinkin. The process began soon after the publication of Keynes' General Theory with the IS-LM model (investment saving–liquidity preference money supply) first presented by John Hicks in a 1937 article. It continued with adaptations of the supply and demand model of markets to Keynesian theory. It represents incentives and costs as playing a pervasive role in shaping decision making. An immediate example of this is the consumer theory of individual demand, which isolates how prices (as costs) and income affect quantity demanded.

The term "neoclassical synthesis" appears to be coined by Paul Samuelson in his influential textbook Economics. According to Samuelson, the neoclassical synthesis should have become a new general economic theory, that could unite positive aspects of previous economic research and become a consensus, over which all members of the economic community believed that the active fiscal and monetary interventions can be used for stabilizing economy and ensuring full employment. Following him, the market economy, based on the reasons described by J. Keynes, cannot provide full employment on its own. But if monetary and fiscal policy is used to tackle underemployment, it will put the economy on a trajectory that applies the principles of classical equilibrium analysis to explain relative prices and resource allocation. The broader neo-Keynesian intellectual program would eventually produce monetarism and other versions of Keynesian macroeconomics in the 1960s.

== Main provisions ==
- Firms and individuals are considered as largely rational, and their behavior can be studied by standard microeconomic methods.
- Animal spirits still matter; they are perceived as the main source of movements in aggregate demand through investment.
- Prices and wages do not adjust quickly to clear markets; thus, markets cannot be considered as competitive.
- There is no automatic labor market equilibrium condition implied, but this equilibrium can be achieved through appropriate monetary and fiscal policies.
- The implication of tâtonnement: prices adjust to excess demand or supply along the lines of the dynamic processes of adjustment suggested by Paul Samuelson in «Foundations of Economic Analysis» (Samuelson, 1947).
- Implication of very active interventionist state: besides the Keynesian macro-economic policy and traditional regulatory and antitrust activities in troublesome areas of industrial organization, it also implies active state participation in areas of market failures, social costs and benefits.
- An economic management is considered as a search for the appropriate mix of monetary and fiscal policies, with relative weight of them being based on the relative elasticities of the IS and LM curves.
- An important role is devoted to the empirical studies of the impact of different economic policies.
- Extensive use of mathematics as a tool for economic analysis.

== Development ==
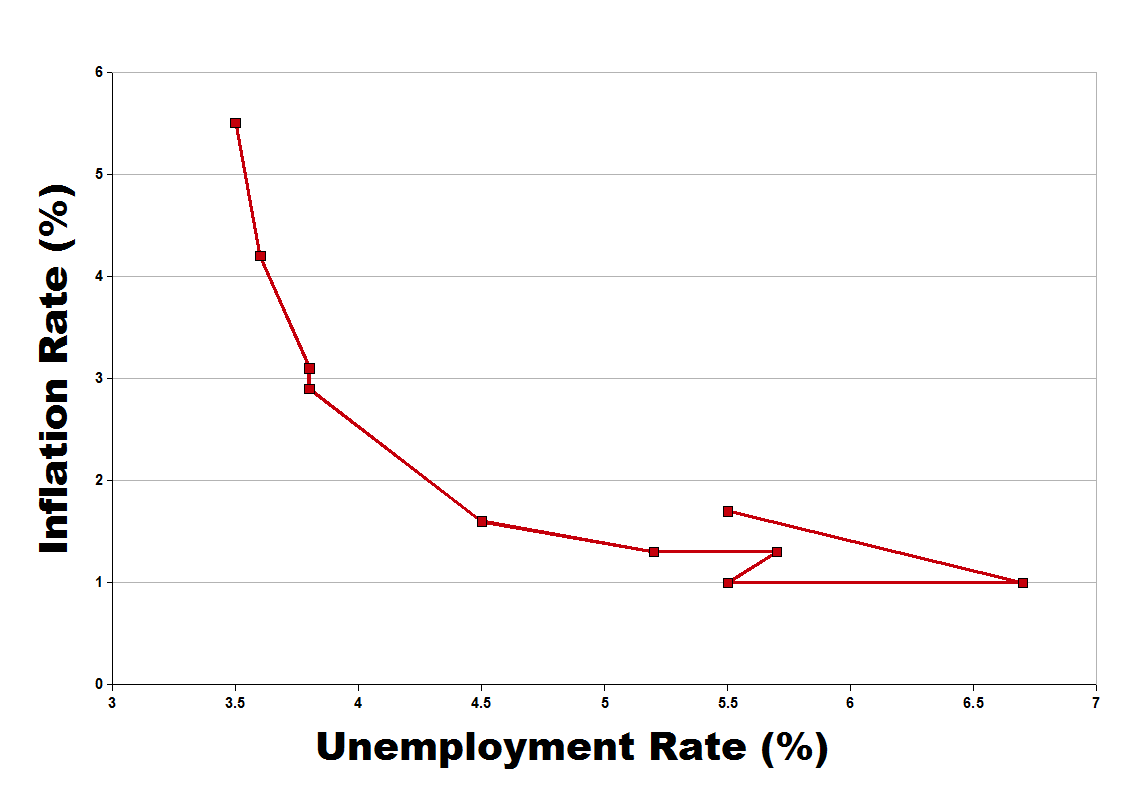
The Phillips curve in the U.S. in the 1960s

The interpretation of J. Keynes suggested by neoclassical synthesis economists is based on the mixture of basic features of general equilibrium theory with Keynesian concepts. Thus, most models of neoclassical synthesis have been labelled as "pragmatic macroeconomics". Neo-Keynesians generally looked at labor contracts as sources of wage stickiness to generate equilibrium models of unemployment. Their efforts resulted in the development of the IS–LM model and other formal modelling of Keynes' ideas.

The development of the neoclassical synthesis started in 1937 with J. Hicks's publication of the paper Mr. Keynes and Classics, where he proposed the IS-LM scheme that has put the Keynesian theory into the more traditional terms of a simplified general equilibrium model with three markets: goods, money, and financial assets. This work marked the beginning of neo-Keynesian macroeconomics. Later, in the 1940s–1950s, the ideas of J. Hicks were supported by F. Modigliani and Paul Samuelson. F. Modigliani in 1944 elaborated on J. Hicks publication, expanding the IS-LM scheme by incorporating the labor market into the model. P. Samuelson coined the term "neoclassical synthesis" in 1955 and put much effort into building and promoting the theory, in particular through his influential book Economics, first published in 1948. One of the main contributions of P. Samuelson made in the first edition of Economics was the 45-degree diagram (frequently known as "Keynesian cross"), that reconciled the competing economics of J.M. Keynes and neoclassical school by placing the neoclassical theory of price and income formation in the context of market competition with Keynesian macroeconomics as a theory of government intervention.

The IS–LM model is used to analyze the effect of demand shocks on the economy.

Many breakthroughs in the development of neoclassical synthesis had happened by the 1950s, with the creation of the IS-LM model by J. Hicks (1937) and A. Hansen (1949), the clarification of the role of the rigidity of nominal wages in the Keynesian model in the work of F. Modigliani (1944), the identification of the importance of the wealth effects and the role of public debt in the work of L.Metzler (1951), and D. Patinkin's clarification of the structure of the macroeconomic model (1956).

== Legacy ==
Through the 1950s, moderate degrees of government-led demand in industrial development and use of fiscal and monetary counter-cyclical policies continued and reached a peak in the "go go" 1960s, where it seemed to many neo-Keynesians that prosperity was now permanent. By the beginning of 1970s, the research program formulated after WWII was generally completed, and the neoclassical synthesis had proved to be very successful. However, with the oil shock of 1973 and the economic problems of the 1970s, many economies experienced "stagflation": high and rising unemployment, coupled with high and rising inflation, contradicting the Phillips curve's normal behaviour.

As the scientific success of the neoclassical synthesis was largely due to its empirical success, this stagflation led to a collapse of the consensus around the neoclassical synthesis and it was attacked for its inability to explain events. Although neoclassical synthesis models were further expanded to include shocks, empirics exposed the main flaw that lay in the core of the theory: the asymmetry of considering individual agents as highly rational but markets as inefficient (particularly labour markets). R. Lucas and T. Sargent highly criticized the theory, claiming that predictions [based on this theory] were widely incorrect, and "that the doctrine on which they were based was fundamentally flawed is now a simple matter of fact".

Stagflation meant that both expansionary (anti-recession) and contractionary (anti-inflation) policies had to be applied simultaneously, a clear impossibility. This produced a "policy bind" and the collapse of the neoclassical-Keynesian consensus on the economy, leading to the development of new classical macroeconomics and new Keynesianism. Through the work of those such as S.Fischer (1977) and J.Taylor (1980), who demonstrated that the Philips curve can be replaced by a model of explicit nominal price and wage-setting with saving most of the traditional results, these two schools would come together to create the new neoclassical synthesis that forms the basis of mainstream economics today.

Following the emergence of the new Keynesian school in the 1970s, neo-Keynesians have sometimes been referred to as "Old-Keynesians".

== Application of the neoclassical synthesis ==
=== Monetary and fiscal policy ===
In the area of macroeconomic policy, particularly monetary and fiscal policy, is where the application of neoclassical synthesis has been the most apparent. It argues that changes in money supply through monetary policy or government spending and taxation through fiscal policy can affect aggregate demand in the short run. This leads to an impact on the level of output and employment in the economy.It also acknowledges that government spending or changes in money supply will not have in a long run any impact on real economic variables like employment and output, because prices and wages will shift to restore equilibrium.

=== Trade and globalization ===
Neoclassical synthesis suggests that in the long run, free trade would be beneficial for most of the countries. It has a simple reasoning such that it allows resources to be allocated more efficiently, therefore it leads to countries having higher productivity and innovation. It also suggests that countries should produce mainly goods and services in which they have apparent advantage against other countries (they can produce at a lower cost) and then trade with other countries goods and services that they are not capable of producing at such a productive level. If all countries involved followed this theory, it will lead to a more efficient allocation of resources and increased output and welfare. Krugman's work on balance-of-payments crises is one of the examples how the neoclassical synthesis has been applied to finance and international trade.

In the short run, it may cause that some workers and industries will experience dislocation and hardship as a result of increased competition from foreign firms. This situation could lead to workers losing their jobs and decrease in wages for certain industries, particularly those that are not competitive globally. To minimize these issues, the neoclassical synthesis suggests that governments could assist affected industries and workers with helpful policies. One of them is income support that would help the workers to face the salary reduction or retraining programs. In the Helpman, E.' book "Understanding Global Trade", he helps root out this problem and overall issues regarding neoclassical synthesis and its application on global trade.

The neoclassical synthesis has been called out in recent years by many scholars for not taking into consideration issues such as income inequality, environmental sustainability, and the distributional effects of globalization. Research shows that the whole theory emphasis on efficiency gains may overlook these critical problems and scholars ask for more detailed and nuanced approach to understanding how globalization and trade truly works.

=== Labor markets ===
When it comes to labor markets, neoclassical synthesis focuses on employment levels and how the wages are determined in a competitive labor market. According to this theory, the determination of wages is the intersection of the demand and supply labor.

The demand of labor is derived from marginal product of labor. Firms will then hire additional workers until they get to the point where marginal product of labor is at the same or lower values than the wage rate. From this idea, the firm will maximize their profit. For this reason, when the demand for goods and services increases, or increase in productivity happens, we will also acknowledge an increase in the demand for labor and a pay rise.

On the other hand, talking about supply of labor. This variable is determined by tradeoff between two variables: the opportunity cost of leisure and the wage rate. When there is an increase in wage rate, it implies that workers are willing to do more work and it ends by them entering the labor force. Nonetheless, the exact opposite can happen, resulting in workers choosing to work less and consume more leisure. From all these relations, we can conclude that the supply of labor is related to the wage rate in a positive manner, but negatively for the opportunity of leisure.

In conclusion, the neoclassical synthesis argues that over time in a competitive labor market, wages and employment levels will simply adjust to reach their equilibrium. Only problem this faces is that in short run there might be some issues connected to minimal wage law, labor unions or efficiency wages, which may prevent the labor market from reaching equilibrium even in longer period of time. In these situations, government can help, specifically their policies that try to promote competition, information dissemination, flexibility. These three policies may help to facilitate wage and adjust employment.

== See also ==
- New classical macroeconomics
- New neoclassical synthesis

General

- History of macroeconomic thought
- Mainstream economics
