= Axel Leijonhufvud =

Swedish economist and academic (1933–2022)

- Born: 6 September 1933; Stockholm, Sweden
- Died: 2 May 2022 (aged 88)
- Burial place: Oakwood Memorial Park Cemetery, Los Angeles

Academic background
- Education: Lund University; University of Pittsburgh; Northwestern University
- Doctoral advisors: Meyer Louis Burstein; Robert W. Clower
- Influences: Léon Walras, John Maynard Keynes

Academic work
- School or tradition: Disequilibrium macroeconomics
- Institutions: University of Trento; UCLA; Brookings Institution

Axel Leijonhufvud (6 September 1933 – 2 May 2022) was a Swedish economist and professor emeritus at the University of California, Los Angeles (UCLA), and professor at the University of Trento, Italy. Leijonhufvud focused his studies on macroeconomic monetary theory. In his defining book On Keynesian Economics and the Economics of Keynes (1968) he focuses on a critique of the interpretation of Keynesian economic theory by Keynesian economists. He goes on to call the standard neoclassical synthesis interpretation of the Keynes' General Theory as having misunderstood and misinterpreted Keynes. In one of his papers, "Life Among the Econ" (1973), he takes a comical yet critical look at the inherent clannish nature of economists; the paper was considered a devastating takedown of economics and economists.

== Early life ==
Axel was born to the noble family Leijonhufvud (Note: "Leijonhufvud" is an obsolete spelling of "lejonhuvud", the Swedish language word for "lion's head", originating as a verbal description of the family's coat of arms, three yellow/gold heraldic lion heads on a blue background.) on 6 September 1933 in Stockholm, Sweden, to Helene Neovius and Erik Gabriel Leijonhufvud. His father was a judge in Scania, a southern province in Sweden. In his early adult years, he served as a seaman and later an officer with the Swedish Army, before leaving to study for a bachelor's degree from the University of Lund, graduating in 1960. He went to the United States on a Scandinavian American Foundation scholarship, landing at the University of Pittsburgh where he obtained a Master of Arts degree in economics. It was during his time here that he was introduced to his ultimate interest in monetary theory. He later obtained a PhD in economics from Northwestern University in 1967.

== Career ==
Leijonhufvud started his career at the University of California, Los Angeles, as an assistant professor at the school of economics in 1964, and became a full-time professor in 1971. In 1991, he started the Center for Computable Economics at UCLA and remained its director until 1997. He retired from UCLA in 1994, and served as a professor emeritus. He joined the University of Trento, Italy, in 1995, as a professor of monetary theory and policy. He retired in 2009.

Leijonhufvud was awarded honoris causa doctoral degrees by the University of Lund in 1983 and the University Nice Sophia Antipolis in 1996.

== Economic theory ==
Leijonhufvud's monetary economics built on the work of the American economist Robert W. Clower. In 1968, at the age of 35, he published a famous scholarly book entitled On Keynesian Economics and the Economics of Keynes. In the book, he argued that Keynesian economics had to be re-examined. He made the case that John Hicks' IS/LM (Investment—Saving / Liquidity preference—Money supply) formulation of Keynes General Theory was an inadequate explanation for the "involuntary unemployment" in John Maynard Keynes's writings. Rather, Leijonhufvud's reading of Keynes emphasizes disequilibrium phenomena, which cannot be addressed in the IS/LM framework, as central to Keynes' explanation of unemployment and economic depression. Leijonhufvud used this observation as a point of departure to advocate a "cybernetic" approach to macroeconomics, where the algorithm by which prices and quantities adjust is explicitly specified, allowing the dynamic economy to be studied without imposing the standard Walrasian equilibrium concept. In particular, Leijonhufvud advocated formally modelling the process by which information moves through the economy. While the "cybernetic" approach may have failed to gain traction in mainstream economics, it presaged the rational expectations revolution that would ultimately supplant the IS/LM model as the dominant paradigm in academic macroeconomics.

Leijonhufvud wrote also the article "The Wicksell Connection: Variation on a Theme", where he presented the Z-Theory. In another article called "Effective Demand Failures", he presents the Corridor Hypothesis.

In 2006, the Economics Department at UCLA organized a conference in honor of Leijonhufvud's contributions to the department and to economics at large. The conference was organized by Roger Farmer, and contains contributions from Farmer, Lars Peter Hansen, Peter Howitt, David K. Levine, Edmund S. Phelps, Thomas J. Sargent, and Kenneth L. Sokoloff, among others. The papers are published in a Festschrift, Macroeconomics in the Small and the Large.

=== Life Among the Econ ===
Published in the Western Economic Journal in 1973, Leijonhufvud's "Life Among the Econ" is a comical article outlining the discipline of economics, and the scholars that practice it, from the perspective of an anthropologist. Professional economists are treated as a tribe known as "the Econ" and ensuing tribal analogues are produced throughout the piece to characterize the group's unusual behavior. The paper takes a comical yet critical look at the inherent clannish and xenophobic nature of economists and was considered a devastating takedown of economics and economists.

== Personal life ==
Leijonhufvud's first marriage was to Märta Ising and together they had three children - Carl, Gabriella, and Christina. He married Earlene Craver in 1977. Leijonhufvud died on 2 May 2022. He was aged 88.

== Select works ==
- Leijonhufvud, Axel (1973). "Life Among the Econ" (PDF). Economic Inquiry. 11 (3): 327–337. doi:10.1111/j.1465-7295.1973.tb01065.x. Archived from the original (PDF) on 21 May 2021.
- Colander, David; Howitt, Peter; Kirman, Alan; Leijonhufvud, Axel; Mehrling, Perry (2008). "Beyond DSGE Models: Toward an Empirically Based Macroeconomics". American Economic Review. 98 (2): 236–240. doi:10.1257/aer.98.2.236. ISSN 0002-8282.
- Leijonhufvud, Axel (2000). Macroeconomic Instability and Coordination: Selected Essays of Axel Leijonhufvud. Edward Elgar Publishing. ISBN 978-1-78100-839-3.
- Leijonhufvud, Axel (1967). "Keynes and the Keynesians: A Suggested Interpretation". The American Economic Review. 57 (2): 401–410. ISSN 0002-8282. JSTOR 1821641.
- Leijonhufvud, Axel (1968). On Keynesian Economics and the Economics of Keynes: A Study in Monetary Theory. Oxford University Press. ISBN 978-0-19-631715-1.
- Leijonhufvud, A. (1979). "The Wicksell Connection: Variations on a Theme". UCLA Economics Working Papers.

== See also ==
- Disequilibrium macroeconomics
