= Milton Friedman bibliography =

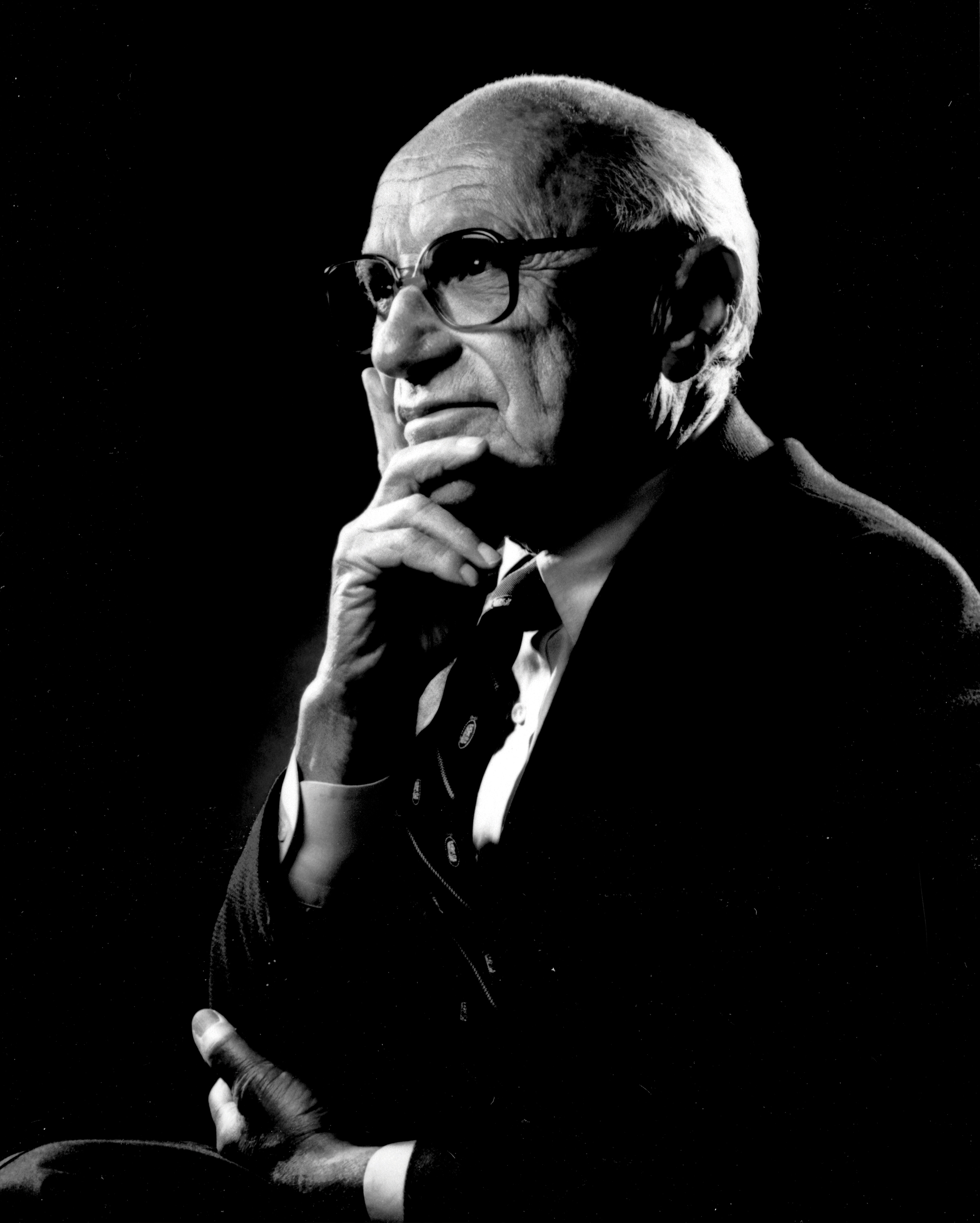
Portrait of Friedman

The following is a list of works by the prominent American economist Milton Friedman.

== Books and articles for general audiences ==
- "Why Money Matters," Wall Street Journal, Nov. 17, 2006, p. A20 (last words)
- J. Daniel Hammond and Claire H. Hammond, ed., Making Chicago Price Theory: Friedman-Stigler Correspondence, 1945–1957. Routledge, 2006. 165 pp. ISBN 0-415-70078-7.
- "Reflections on A Monetary History," The Cato Journal, Vol. 23, 2004, essay
- Two Lucky People: Memoirs (with Rose Friedman) ISBN 0-226-26414-9 (1998) excerpt and text search
- George J. Stigler, 1911–1991: Biographical Memoir, (National Academy of Sciences: 1998), online
- "The Case for Free Trade" with Rose Friedman, 1997, Hoover Digest magazine article
- Money Mischief: Episodes in Monetary History (1994) ISBN 0-15-162042-3, ISBN 0-15-661930-X, 286 pp.
- George Stigler: A Personal Reminiscence, Journal of Political Economy Vol. 101, No. 5 (Oct., 1993), pp. 768–73 JSTOR
- "The Drug War as a Socialist Enterprise," in Arnold S. Trebach, ed. Friedman and Szasz on Liberty and Drugs: Essays on the Free Market and Prohibition (Drug Policy Foundation Press: 1992)
- Economic Freedom, Human Freedom, Political Freedom ISBN 1-883969-00-X (1992), short pamphlet
- "Milton Friedman's extempore comments at the 1989 Hawaii conference: on India, Israel, Palestine, the USA, Debt and its uses, Erhardt abolishing exchange controls, Etc", provided by Indian economist Subroto Roy (May 21, 1989)
- The Essence of Friedman, essays edited by Kurt R. Leube, (1987) (ISBN 0-8179-8662-6)
- "The Case for Overhauling the Federal Reserve," (1985), Challenge magazine article
- The Tyranny of the Status Quo (1984) ISBN 0-15-192379-5, 192 pp
- Free to Choose: A Personal Statement, with Rose Friedman, (1980), highly influential restatement of policy views
- From Galbraith to Economic Freedom, Institute of Economic Affairs, Occasional Paper 49 (1977)
- There's No Such Thing as a Free Lunch (1975), columns from Newsweek magazine online version
- Unemployment versus Inflation?, Institute of Economic Affairs, Occasional Paper 44 (1975)
- Social Security: Universal or Selective? with Wilbur J. Cohen (1972)
- "The Social Responsibility of Business is to Increase its Profits", The New York Times Magazine, September 13, 1970
- "Why Not a Volunteer Army?", New Individualist Review, Spring 1967
- An Economist's Protest: Columns in Political Economy, Thomas Horton and Company (1966)
- Capitalism and Freedom (1962), highly influential series of essays that established Friedman's position on major issues of public policy excerpts
- Roofs or Ceilings?: The Current Housing Problem with George J. Stigler. (Foundation for Economic Education, 1946), 22 pp. attacks rent control

== Videos ==
- The Power of Choice (2007).
- Free to Choose (1980, 1990).
- PRC Forum: Milton Friedman (1987).
- Milton Friedman interviewed on America's Drug Forum (1991)
- Monetary Revolutions (1992).
- Money (1992).
- Efforts in Eastern Europe to Localize Government (1993).
- Privatization Trends in Eastern Europe (1993).
- Health Care Reform (1992).
- Economically Speaking – Why Economists Disagree (1978).
- Milton Friedman Speaks: Lecture 01, "What is America?" and Q & A (1978).
- Milton Friedman Speaks: Lecture 02, "Myths That Conceal Reality" and Q & A (1978).
- Milton Friedman Speaks: Lecture 03, "Is Capitalism Humane?" and Q & A (1978).
- Milton Friedman Speaks: Lecture 04, "The Role of Government in a Free Society" and Q & A (1978).
- Milton Friedman Speaks: Lecture 05, "What Is Wrong with the Welfare State?" and Q & A (1978).
- Milton Friedman Speaks: Lecture 06, "Money and Inflation" and Q & A (1978).
- Milton Friedman Speaks: Lecture 07, "Is Tax Reform Possible?" and Q & A (1978).
- Milton Friedman Speaks: Lecture 08, "Free Trade: Producer vs. Consumer" and Q & A (1978).
- Milton Friedman Speaks: Lecture 09, "The Energy Crisis: A Humane Solution" and Q & A (1978).
- Milton Friedman Speaks: Lecture 10, "The Economics of Medical Care" and Q & A (1978).
- Milton Friedman Speaks: Lecture 11, "Putting Learning Back in the Classroom" and Q & A (1978).
- Milton Friedman Speaks: Lecture 12, "Who Protects the Consumer?" and Q & A (1978).
- Milton Friedman Speaks: Lecture 13, "Who Protects the Worker?" and Q & A (1978).
- Milton Friedman Speaks: Lecture 14, "Equality and Freedom in the Free Enterprise System" and Q & A (1978).
- Milton Friedman Speaks: Lecture 15, "The Future of Our Free Society" and Q & A (1978).

== Economic books and articles (in chronological order) ==
- "Professor Pigou's Method for Measuring Elasticities of Demand From Budgetary Data" The Quarterly Journal of Economics Vol. 50, No. 1 (Nov. 1935), pp. 151–63 JSTOR
- "Marginal Utility of Money and Elasticities of Demand," The Quarterly Journal of Economics Vol. 50, No. 3 (May 1936), pp. 532–33 JSTOR
- "The Use of Ranks to Avoid the Assumption of Normality Implicit in the Analysis of Variance," Journal of the American Statistical Association Vol. 32, No. 200 (Dec. 1937), pp. 675–701 JSTOR
- "The Inflationary Gap: II. Discussion of the Inflationary Gap," American Economic Review Vol. 32, No. 2, Part 1 (Jun. 1942), pp. 314–20 JSTOR
- "The Spendings Tax as a Wartime Fiscal Measure," American Economic Review Vol. 33, No. 1, Part 1 (Mar. 1943), pp. 50–62 JSTOR
- Taxing to Prevent Inflation: Techniques for Estimating Revenue Requirements (Columbia U.P. 1943, 236 pp) with Carl Shoup and Ruth P. Mack
- Income from Independent Professional Practice with Simon Kuznets (1945), Friedman's PhD thesis
- "Lange on Price Flexibility and Employment: A Methodological Criticism," American Economic Review Vol. 36, No. 4 (Sep. 1946), pp. 613–31 JSTOR
- "Utility Analysis of Choices Involving Risk" with Leonard Savage, 1948, Journal of Political Economy Vol. 56, No. 4 (Aug. 1948), pp. 279–304 JSTOR
- "A Monetary and Fiscal Framework for Economic Stability", 1948, American Economic Review, Vol. 38, No. 3 (Jun. 1948), pp. 245–64 JSTOR
- "A Fiscal and Monetary Framework for Economic Stability," Econometrica Vol. 17, Supplement: Report of the Washington Meeting (Jul. 1949), pp. 330–32 JSTOR
- "The Marshallian Demand Curve," The Journal of Political Economy Vol. 57, No. 6 (Dec. 1949), pp. 463–95 JSTOR
- "Wesley C. Mitchell as an Economic Theorist," The Journal of Political Economy Vol. 58, No. 6 (Dec. 1950), pp. 465–93 JSTOR
- "Some Comments on the Significance of Labor Unions for Economic Policy", 1951, in D. McC. Wright, editor, The Impact of the Union.
- "Commodity-Reserve Currency," Journal of Political Economy Vol. 59, No. 3 (Jun. 1951), pp. 203–32 JSTOR
- "Price, Income, and Monetary Changes in Three Wartime Periods," American Economic Review Vol. 42, No. 2, Papers and Proceedings of the Sixty-fourth Annual Meeting of the American Economic Association (May 1952), pp. 612–25 JSTOR
- "The Expected-Utility Hypothesis and the Measurability of Utility", with Leonard Savage, 1952, Journal of Political Economy Vol. 60, No. 6 (Dec. 1952), pp. 463–74 JSTOR
- The Methodology of Positive Economics (1953)
- Essays in Positive Economics (1953)
- "Choice, Chance, and the Personal Distribution of Income," Journal of Political Economy Vol. 61, No. 4 (Aug. 1953), pp. 277–90 JSTOR
- "A Memorandum to the Government of India November 1955", MS first published at University of Hawaii May 21, 1989; first published in the book Foundations of India's Political Economy, edited by Subroto Roy & WE James, Sage 1992
- "The Quantity Theory of Money: A restatement", 1956, in Friedman, editor, Studies in Quantity Theory.
- A Theory of the Consumption Function (1957)
- "A Statistical Illusion in Judging Keynesian Models" with Gary S. Becker, Journal of Political Economy Vol. 65, No. 1 (Feb. 1957), pp. 64–75 JSTOR
- "The Supply of Money and Changes in Prices and Output", 1958, in Relationship of Prices to Economic Stability and Growth.
- "The Demand for Money: Some Theoretical and Empirical Results," Journal of Political Economy Vol. 67, No. 4 (Aug. 1959), pp. 327–51 JSTOR
- A Program for Monetary Stability (Fordham University Press, 1960) 110 pp online version
- "Monetary Data and National Income Estimates," Economic Development and Cultural Change Vol. 9, No. 3, (Apr. 1961), pp. 267–86 JSTOR
- "The Lag in Effect of Monetary Policy," Journal of Political EconomyVol. 69, No. 5 (Oct. 1961), pp. 447–66 JSTOR
- Price Theory ISBN 0-202-06074-8 (1962), college textbook online version
- "The Interpolation of Time Series by Related Series," Journal of the American Statistical Association Vol. 57, No. 300 (Dec. 1962), pp. 729–57 JSTOR
- "Should There be an Independent Monetary Authority?", in L.B. Yeager, editor, In Search of a Monetary Constitution
- Inflation: Causes and consequences, 1963.
- "Money and Business Cycles," The Review of Economics and Statistics Vol. 45, No. 1, Part 2, Supplement (Feb. 1963), pp. 32–64 JSTOR
- A Monetary History of the United States, 1867–1960, with Anna J. Schwartz, 1963; part 3 reprinted as The Great Contraction
- "Money and Business Cycles" with A. J. Schwartz, 1963, Review of Economics & Statistics.
- "The Relative Stability of Monetary Velocity and the Investment Multiplier in the United States, 1898–1958", with D. Meiselman, 1963, in Stabilization Policies.
- "A Reply to Donald Hester", with D. Meiselman, 1964
- "Reply to Ando and Modigliani and to DePrano and Mayer," with David Meiselman. American Economic Review Vol. 55, No. 4 (Sep. 1965), pp. 753–85 JSTOR
- "Interest Rates and the Demand for Money," Journal of Law and Economics Vol. 9 (Oct. 1966), pp. 71–85 JSTOR
- The Balance of Payments: Free Versus Fixed Exchange Rates with Robert V. Roosa (1967)
- "The Monetary Theory and Policy of Henry Simons," Journal of Law and Economics Vol. 10 (Oct. 1967), pp. 1–13 JSTOR
- "What Price Guideposts?", in G.P. Schultz, R.Z. Aliber, editors, Guidelines
- "The Role of Monetary Policy." American Economic Review, Vol. 58, No. 1 (Mar. 1968), pp. 1–17 JSTOR presidential address to American Economics Association
- "Money: the Quantity Theory", 1968, IESS
- "The Definition of Money: Net Wealth and Neutrality as Criteria" with Anna J. Schwartz, Journal of Money, Credit and Banking Vol. 1, No. 1 (Feb. 1969), pp. 1–14 JSTOR
- Monetary vs. Fiscal Policy with Walter W. Heller (1969)
- "Comment on Tobin", 1970, Quarterly Journal of Economics
- Monetary Statistics of the United States: Estimates, Sources, Methods. with Anna J. Schwartz, 1970.
- "A Theoretical Framework for Monetary Analysis," Journal of Political Economy Vol. 78, No. 2 (Mar. 1970), pp. 193–238 JSTOR
- The Counter-Revolution in Monetary Theory 1970.
- "A Monetary Theory of Nominal Income", 1971, Journal of Political Economy JSTOR
- "Government Revenue from Inflation," Journal of Political Economy Vol. 79, No. 4 (Jul. 1971), pp. 846–56 JSTOR
- "Have Monetary Policies Failed?" American Economic Review Vol. 62, No. 1/2 (1972), pp. 11–18 JSTOR
- "Comments on the Critics," Journal of Political Economy Vol. 80, No. 5 (Sep. 1972), pp. 906–50 JSTOR
- "Comments on the Critics", 1974, in Gordon, ed. Milton Friedman and his Critics.
- "Monetary Correction: A proposal for escalation clauses to reduce the cost of ending inflation", 1974
- The Optimum Quantity of Money: And Other Essays (1976)
- Milton Friedman in Australia, 1975 (1975)
- Milton Friedman's Monetary Framework: A Debate with His Critics (1975) excerpt and text search
- "Comments on Tobin and Buiter", 1976, in J. Stein, editor, Monetarism.
- "Inflation and Unemployment: Nobel lecture", 1977, Journal of Political Economy. Vol. 85, pp. 451–72. JSTOR
- Introduction to New Individualist Review. Indianapolis: Liberty Fund (1981), pp. ix-xiv. ISSN 0028-5439. ISBN 0913966908. A collection of issues spanning April 1961 (vol. 1, no. 1) to Winter 1968 (vol. 5, no. 1).
- "Interrelations between the United States and the United Kingdom, 1873–1975.", with A.J. Schwartz, 1982, J Int Money and Finance
- Monetary Trends in the United States and the United Kingdom: Their relations to income, prices and interest rates, 1876–1975. with Anna J. Schwartz, 1982
- "Monetary Policy: Theory and Practice," Journal of Money, Credit and Banking Vol. 14, No. 1 (Feb. 1982), pp. 98–118 JSTOR
- "Monetary Policy: Tactics versus strategy", 1984, in Moore, editor, To Promote Prosperity.
- "Lessons from the 1979–1982 Monetary Policy Experiment," American Economic Review Vol. 74, No. 2, Papers and Proceedings ... of the American Economic Association (May 1984), pp. 397–401.
- "Has Government Any Role in Money?" with Anna J. Schwartz, 1986, JME
- "Quantity Theory of Money", in J. Eatwell, M. Milgate, P. Newman, eds., The New Palgrave (1998)
- "Money and the Stock Market," Journal of Political Economy Vol. 96, No. 2 (Apr. 1988), pp. 221–45 JSTOR
- "Bimetallism Revisited," Journal of Economic Perspectives Vol. 4, No. 4 (Autumn 1990), pp. 85–104 JSTOR
- "The Crime of 1873," Journal of Political Economy Vol. 98, No. 6 (Dec. 1990), pp. 1159–1194 JSTOR
- "Franklin D. Roosevelt, Silver, and China," Journal of Political Economy Vol. 100, No. 1 (Feb. 1992), pp. 62–83 JSTOR
- Milton Friedman on Economics: Selected Papers by Milton Friedman, edited by Gary S. Becker (2008)

== About Friedman ==
- Butler, Eamonn. "Milton Friedman: A Guide to His Economic Thought" ISBN 978-0-87663-476-9 Introductory guide to Milton Friedman
- Chao, Hsiang-ke. "Milton Friedman and the Emergence of the Permanent Income Hypothesis" History of Political Economy 2003 35(1): 77–104. ISSN 0018-2702 Fulltext in Project Muse
- A.W. (Bob) Coats; "The Legacy of Milton Friedman as Teacher" Economic Record, Vol. 77, 2001
- Doherty, Brian. Radicals for Capitalism: A Freewheeling History of the Modern American Libertarian Movement (2007)
- Ebenstein, Lanny. Milton Friedman: A Biography (2007) excerpt and text search
- Frazer, William. Power and Ideas: Milton Friedman and the Big U-Turn. Vol. 1: The Background. Vol. 2: The U-Turn. Gainesville, Fla.: Gulf/Atlantic, 1988. 867 pp.
- Hammond, J. Daniel. "Remembering Economics" Journal of the History of Economic Thought 2003 25(2): 133–43. ISSN 1042-7716; focus is on Friedman
- Hirsch, Abraham, and Neil de Marchi. Milton Friedman: Economics in Theory and Practice (1990) his methodology
- Jordan, Jerry L., Allan H. Meltzer, Thomas J. Sargent and Anna J. Schwartz; "Milton, Money, and Mischief: Symposium and Articles in Honor of Milton Friedman's 80th Birthday" Economic Inquiry. Volume: 31. Issue: 2. 1993. pp. 197+. in JSTOR
- Kasper, Sherryl. The Revival of Laissez-Faire in American Macroeconomic Theory: A Case Study of Its Pioneers (2002)
- Krugman, Paul. "Who Was Milton Friedman?" New York Review of Books Vol 54#2 Feb. 15, 2007 online version
- Leeson, Robert, ed. Ideology and International Economy: The Decline and Fall of Bretton Woods (2003)
- Powell, Jim. The Triumph of Liberty (New York: Free Press, 2000). See profile of Friedman in the chapter "Inflation and Depression."
- Rayack, Elton (1987). Not So Free to Choose: The Political Economy of Milton Friedman and Ronald Reagan. Praeger. Archived from the original on 2012-10-10 – via Questia.
- Roy, Subroto, "Milton Friedman, A Man of Reason (1912–2006)", Obituary in The Statesman newspaper Perspective Page, www.thestatesman.net, November 22, 2006, also available at http://independentindian.com/2006/11/22/milton-friedman-a-man-of-reason-1912-2006/
- Tavlas, George S. "Retrospectives: Was the Monetarist Tradition Invented?" Journal of Economic Perspectives 1998 12(4): 211–22. ISSN 0895-3309 Fulltext in JSTOR
- Stigler, George Joseph. Memoirs of an Unregulated Economist (1988)
- Wahid, Abu N. M. ed; Frontiers of Economics: Nobel Laureates of the Twentieth Century. Greenwood Press. 2002 pp. 109–15.
- Walters, Alan (1987), "Friedman, Milton," New Palgrave: A Dictionary of Economics, v. 2, pp. 422–26
