= Gordon St. Angelo =

Indiana Democratic State Chairman
- In office 1964–1974

Personal details
- Born: June 20, 1927 Huntingburg, Indiana, USA
- Died: October 18, 2011 (aged 84)
- Party: Democrat, until 1972. Republican Party
- Spouse: Beatrice (Beattie) Larson St. Angelo (August 23, 1930 - February 11, 2007)
- Relatives: Thomas St. Angelo (uncle)
- Education: North Central College

Gordon St. Angelo (June 20, 1927 – October 18, 2011) born in Huntingburg, Indiana, US was a former Democratic Party State Chairman of the state of Indiana and was a prominent politician during the 1950s, 1960s, and 1970s.

Gordon St. Angelo was born on June 20, 1927, to George and Lillian (Salat) St. Angelo in Huntingburg, Indiana. He served in the Navy at the end of World War II. He then attended North Central College, where he was active in student politics. He there met his future wife Beatrice Mae Larson, who was from Watertown, South Dakota. Gordon became active in Democratic Party politics in 1954. He was elected Dubois County Chairman in 1958. An early key supporter of then Senator John F. Kennedy, he became 8th District Chairman in 1960.

St. Angelo worked on two presidential campaigns including holding the position of National Co-chairman of Humphrey for President Committee. He was also manager of Roger Branigin's successful campaign for the governorship of Indiana in 1964. After managing the campaign of Governor Roger D. Branigan in 1964, St. Angelo was elected state Democratic Party Chairman, a position he held until 1974. His tenure was longer than that of any party chairman in Indiana. From 1974 to 1996, he was vice-president of Community Development for the Lilly Endowment, and during this time was a vocal proponent for the development of free market economies in North and South America.

St. Angelo's political reach extended beyond the state. He was Deputy Democratic Party National Chairman from June to November, 1968, when he helped manage the Hubert Humphrey presidential campaign. In 1974 St. Angelo left politics to become Senior Program Officer of community development at the Lilly Endowment, where he loved working for twenty three years. There he was instrumental in expanding the role of non-profits in public policy, with many positive civil- and individual-rights implications. His building of coalitions between non-profit think tanks was instrumental in the passage of the North American Free Trade Agreement. In 1973, he ran for National Democratic Party chairman, being narrowly defeated by Larry O'Brien.

St. Angelo also served on the boards of the University of Indianapolis (1965–1993), St. Meinrad College, WFYI, the United Way, the Welfare Service League, the State Employment Commission, the Indiana Division of the National Civil Rights Commission, and the Indianapolis 500 Festival Committee. Starting with his work at the Lilly Endowment, St. Angelo and Beatty took special interest in historic New Harmony, Indiana which they visited often. He was appointed by Governor Evan Bayh to the New Harmony Commission and served on the board of the Robert Lee Blaffer Foundation until his death (chairman, 1995–2006). He received honorary doctorates from the University of Indianapolis and the University of Southern Indiana. He received "Sagamore of the Wabash" awards for his service to Indiana from Governors Welsh, Branigan, Whitcomb, Bowen, Orr, Bayh and Daniels.

In 1996, St. Angelo helped create a foundation with Nobel Laureate Milton Friedman and his wife, Rose Friedman to promote and help establish educational choice in America. He served as President & CEO of the Milton and Rose D. Friedman Foundation for School Choice until 2009.

Though he started his career in the Democratic party, he was a supporter of many Republican candidates since the mid-seventies. For example, he endorsed Indiana Governor Mitch Daniels, a Republican, for both of his gubernatorial campaigns.

St. Angelo died on October 18, 2011, in Indianapolis, Indiana.
