= A Program for Monetary Stability =

Book by the Milton Friedman

- 1983 edition
- Author: Milton Friedman
- Language: English
- Published: 1960
- Publisher: Fordham University Press

A Program for Monetary Stability is a book by the American economist Milton Friedman. It has been published by Fordham University Press in 1960 with consecutive re-prints appearing in 1961, 1963, 1965, 1969, 1970, 1975, and 1980. In the Prefatory Note Friedman states that the book is a revised and expanded version of the third of the Moorhouse I. X. Millar Lecture Series, which he gave at Fordham University in October 1959. At the same time, he claims that the book has resulted from the joint research with Anna Schwartz under the NBER project.

== Contents ==
The book comprises four chapters:

1. The Background of Monetary Policy: In this chapter, Friedman first explains why government should intervene in monetary and banking questions. Although he proclaims himself a liberal, he thinks there are good reasons for not leaving monetary issues entirely to the market forces because with fiduciary money the government should prevent fraud and enforce contracts. Furthermore, he argues that “some external limit must be placed on the volume of fiduciary currency in order to maintain its value”. Also, issuing fiduciary money is a technical monopoly and this activity produces externalities, so all this serves as additional arguments for the role of government, which should provide stable monetary framework on a par with the stable legal framework. As a result, he claims that “there is probably no other area of economic activity with respect to which government intervention has been so uniformly accepted.” He reviews the major depressions before the establishment of the Federal Reserve: the 1837-1843 period, 1873-1879, 1890s, and 1907-1908, concluding that almost all of them were associated with monetary developments, except for the last episode. He reviews the record after the establishment of FED claiming that after 1913 there was larger monetary instability. He states that every major economic disturbance, inflation and contraction, has been accompanied by a significant monetary disturbance. He states, “the central problem is not to construct a highly sensitive instrument that can continuously offset instability introduced by other factors, but rather to prevent monetary arrangements from themselves becoming a primary source of instability.”
2. The Tools of the Federal Reserve System: Here, Friedman discuss the Fed's tools of credit policy and criticizes the controls over margin requirements on security loans, opposes the direct controls on consumer installment credit, and refutes the controls on interest rates on demand and time deposits. He discusses the tools of monetary policy arguing that “open market operations alone are a sufficient and efficient tool for monetary policy. Variations in reserve requirements... share with rediscounting the property of being a technically poor instrument for controlling the stock of money. Both should be eliminated or greatly altered.” He explains how open market operations alone can ensure smoother and more precise control of the high-powered money not withstanding whether monetary policy is implemented via the money stock or the interest rate. He argues that the discount rate introduces confusion between the effects of Fed on monetary policy and its effects on the credit markets. In this way, the discount rate diverges the attention from the main task of Fed – the control of the stock of money. Friedman discusses variations of reserve requirements as a monetary policy tool. He claims that variable required reserves should be eliminated or should be set and kept at fixed level. According to him, the main defect of this tool is that it changes infrequently, which means it has drastic effects on the banks; it is difficult to reverse its changes; it needs to be offset by the open market operations with uncertain effects on the stock of money; and it affects the composition between earning and non-earning bank assets, thus, affecting bank profitability. He concludes that open market operations should be the monetary policy instrument for several reasons: they are impersonal, they can be used continuously on a day-to-day basis, the operations can be reversed within a day, their amount can be varied, they need not be announced publicly so they do not cause any speculation about their future course, they do not affect bank profitability, they enable Fed to determine the amount of high-powered money more precisely, and the link between Fed's actions and the stock of money is more direct and predictable.
3. Debt Management and Banking Reform: Friedman states that debt management by the Treasury and open market operations by the FED have the same effects on the money stock. He proposes that the Treasury use one kind of accounts – either with the banks or with the FED. He criticizes the legal limitation on the interest rate paid on long-term government securities. He proposes a deep reform that would provide a coordination of the Treasury's debt management operations with the FED's open market operations – FED should be responsible for all transactions with treasury securities. He criticizes the Treasury's debt issuing practice as the one that creates monetary instability. He proposes within the present institutional and administrative structure, issue short-term bills for seasonal needs and moderately long-term bonds; both issues should be made regularly (weekly or bi-weekly); sell them only at auctions; shift from auctions with a single bid to auctions with multiple bids and maximum price for some specified amounts. Friedman states that the fractional reserve system has two defects: the excessive government intervention in the banks’ lending and investment decisions associated with the deposit insurance; and its inherent instability in the sense that the amount of reserves depends on the public's decisions about the form of holding money (currency versus deposits) and the banks’ decisions about the structure of their assets. Friedman proposes that banks hold 100% reserves for deposits, which means that the stock of money would be equal to the high-powered money. This reform implies that banks would be divided in two different institutions: depository institutions, which would receive demand deposits covered by 100% reserves; and investment trust or brokerage firms, which would be able to issue shares and bonds and to lend money and to invest in securities. He proposes that FED would pay interest on the banks’ reserves.
4. The Goals and Criteria of Monetary Policy: Friedman reviews the US experience with the gold standard during the 19 and 20th century, criticizes the US gold policy and the role of gold in the US monetary system, and proposes abandoning the system of fixed exchange rates along with the fixed official price of gold. He claims that relying on discretion in monetary policy has produced unfortunate monetary consequences, i.e. continuous shifts in monetary policy caused by the political pressures on the central bank or the changes in the personal beliefs and opinions. He refutes price stability as a relevant goal of monetary policy because, in the short-term, the link between money and price changes is loose and imperfectly known. Another problem refers to the long and variable time-lags. Price stability would be a good guide to monetary policy if we knew the effects of non-monetary factors on prices, the exact time lag of present monetary actions, and the size of the effects of present monetary actions. Therefore, he proposes monetary aggregates as a guide of monetary policy, because they are under direct control by the central bank. Specifically, he proposes the fixed growth of the money stock suggesting an annual growth between 3 and 5%.

At the end of the book Friedman lists his recommendations as follows:

- With respect to FED: Fed should use its open market operations to provide a steady rate of 4% growth in the stock of money; to repel its obligation to keep 25% gold reserve; it should pay market interest rate on bank's deposits; repeal interest rate controls on bank deposits; repeal control over margin requirements for securities; repeal its loans and discount rate; repeal variable reserve requirements; enable Fed to issue its own securities.
- With respect to Treasury: eliminate public debt management by the Treasury and give this function to the Fed; alternatively, issue only short-term bills and long-term bonds at regular auctions with the same price paid by the buyers and rely either on deposits in commercial banks or deposits in Fed banks; eliminate the official gold price and move to flexible exchange rates; retire US notes and permit only Fed to issue notes.
- With respect to commercial banks: 100% reserve requirement for deposit banks with free entry in the deposit taking business; alternatively, make reserve requirements the same for all banks and deposits; repeal the prohibition to pay interest on demand deposits and the control of interest rates on time deposits.

== Reviews ==
In its review, The Journal of Finance describes the book as "simple and logical, the style extremely lucid and readable... This book... bristles with suggestions, brilliant analysis, and numerous recommendations - some old, some new, some deserving wide support, others that are provocative, radical, even brash. One would have to look far to find so much controversial material in such small compass... Everyone who reads this book will admire the ingenuity and mental acuteness displayed by a very competent economist." The American Economic Review describes the book as "provocative" whereas Review of Social Economy claims that "this excellent, though provoking book... makes us better aware of the fundamental problems... of a modern economic world". According to The Christian Science Monitor Friedman "offers sweeping suggestions for reforming the monetary and banking systems of the United States" and "introduces interesting proposals for altering the monetary instruments currently employed by the Federal Reserve Board". Similarly, The Wall Street Journal calls the book "penetrating" arguing that "it can be recommended for a good look at the real roots of inflation - the look that thus far has not been widespread enough, among enough people."
