= EdChoice =

American education reform organization

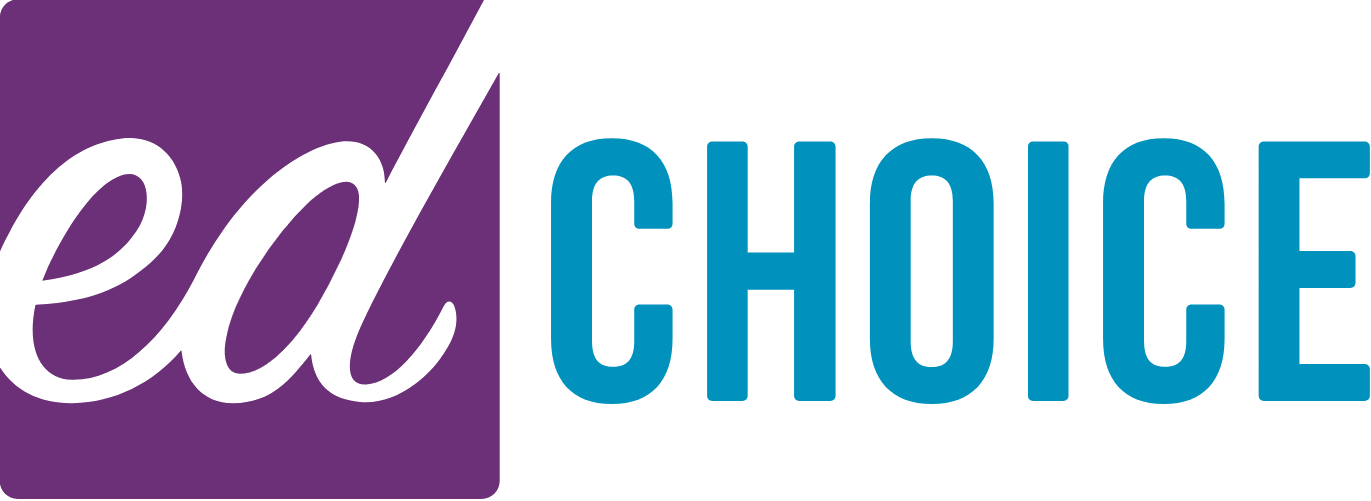
- Founders: Milton and Rose D. Friedman
- Established: 1996
- Chair: Fred Klipsch
- President & CEO: Robert Enlow
- Budget: Revenue: $11.7 million Expenses: $12.9 million (FYE December 2024)
- Formerly called: Friedman Foundation for Educational Choice
- Address: 111 Monument Circle Indianapolis, Indiana 46204
- Location: 39.7690°N 86.1571°W
- Website: www.edchoice.org

EdChoice, formerly the Friedman Foundation for Educational Choice, is an American education reform organization headquartered in Indianapolis, Indiana. It was founded in 1996 by Milton and Rose D. Friedman. The organization's mission is to advance "school choice for all children" nationwide.

The Wall Street Journal has called EdChoice "the nation's leading advocate of vouchers". According to its website, EdChoice works with "nonprofits, schools, community organizations, businesses, parents, teachers, and concerned citizens to provide general education, outreach, and advocacy on school choice".

== History ==
The Friedman Foundation for Educational Choice was founded in March 1996 in Indianapolis, Indiana. It originally was known as the Milton & Rose D. Friedman Foundation. Indiana politician and friend of the Friedmans Gordon St. Angelo served as the foundation's first president until 2009, when he was succeeded by Robert Enlow. Other notable founding directors of the foundation include J. Patrick Rooney and Mitch Daniels.

In 2016 the Friedman Foundation announced it would change its name later in the year to reflect the Friedmans' desire to separate their personal legacy from the intellectual legacy of educational choice. They specifically directed the Foundation's board of directors to stop using the Friedman name at some point after their deaths. The Friedman Foundation announced that its new name would be EdChoice and that it would focus its mission on three areas: educating and informing the public about the benefits of school choice; training and equipping policymakers and stakeholders with the skills they need to support school choice; and advancing high-quality school choice programs in states across the nation.

== School choice ==
In 1955, Milton Friedman put forth the idea of using free market principles to improve the United States public school system. Typically, public schools are funded by state and local taxes, and children are assigned a public school based on where their parents live. Friedman proposed that parents should be able to receive those education funds in the form of vouchers that would allow them to choose their children's schools, including public, private, religious, and secular options. The Foundation shares Friedman's view and focuses on creating and expanding school choice programs through vouchers, tax-based incentive programs, or education savings accounts.

== Policy influence ==
The organization's work is state-focused, with an emphasis on legislation and judicial matters related to school choice. EdChoice also conducts educational and advocacy work on school choice legislation in states, including Alaska, Indiana, Montana, New Hampshire, North Carolina, and Tennessee.

The Friedman Foundation was involved with the U.S. Supreme Court's landmark decision on Ohio's private school choice program in Cleveland, filing an amicus brief along with the Center for Individual Freedom, Cato Institute, and Goldwater Institute in support of the petitioners. In Zelman v. Simmons-Harris, the Court held that Cleveland's school voucher program did not violate the First Amendment's Establishment Clause.

In 2013, the Friedman Foundation was credited with influencing the Indiana Supreme Court's unanimous ruling that the nation's largest school voucher program was constitutional. The Friedman Foundation was cited in the ruling. Responding to the court's decision, then-Indiana Governor Mike Pence credited the Friedman Foundation for its work in ensuring the program's continuation.

== Research and publications ==
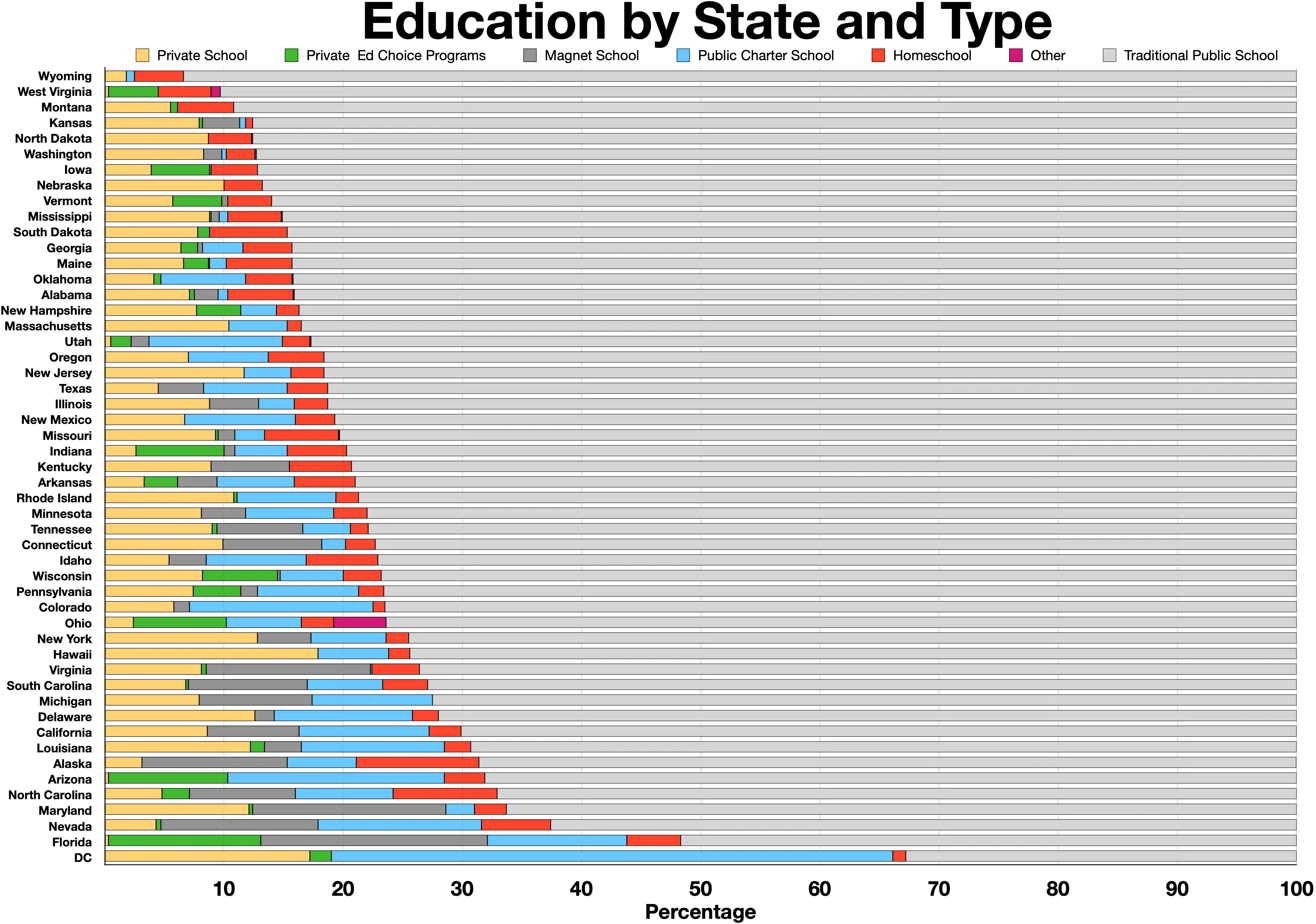
Education by State and Type Private school Private EdChoice Magnet school Public charter school Homeschool Public school

EdChoice produces numerous state and national policy studies, research briefs, and voter surveys. Its reports include "The School Staffing Surge: Decades of Employment Growth in America's Public Schools" and "A Win-Win Solution: The Empirical Evidence on School Choice".

EdChoice also annually releases "The ABCs of School Choice", a guide to every private school choice program in the U.S. The guide summarizes each voucher, tax-credit scholarship, education savings account, and individual tax credit/deduction program in operation. It details each program's funding levels, eligibility requirements, historic participation rates, stories of enrolled students, parents, and schools, and "Friedman Feedback" on how to "improve" according to the Friedmans' vision.
