= Thomas St. Angelo =

American politician

Member of the Wisconsin State Assembly from the Barron County district
- In office 1961–1963

Personal details
- Born: January 13, 1889 Cumberland, Wisconsin, U.S.
- Died: June 16, 1967 (aged 78)
- Party: Republican
- Relatives: Gordon St. Angelo (nephew)
- Education: La Salle Extension University

Thomas St. Angelo (January 13, 1889 – June 16, 1967) was a member of the Wisconsin State Assembly.

== Biography ==
St. Angelo was born on January 13, 1889, in Cumberland, Wisconsin. He attended La Salle Extension University. From 1945 to 1951 and again in 1958, St. Angelo chaired the Barron County, Wisconsin chapter of the International Red Cross and Red Crescent Movement. He died on June 16, 1967, at Cumberland Memorial Hospital, following a heart attack.

== Career ==
St. Angelo was elected to the Assembly and re-elected in 1962. Previously, he had been an unsuccessful candidate for the Assembly in 1958. He was a Republican. The library in Cumberland, Wisconsin, is named in his honor.
