= Anna Schwartz =

American economist (1915–2012)

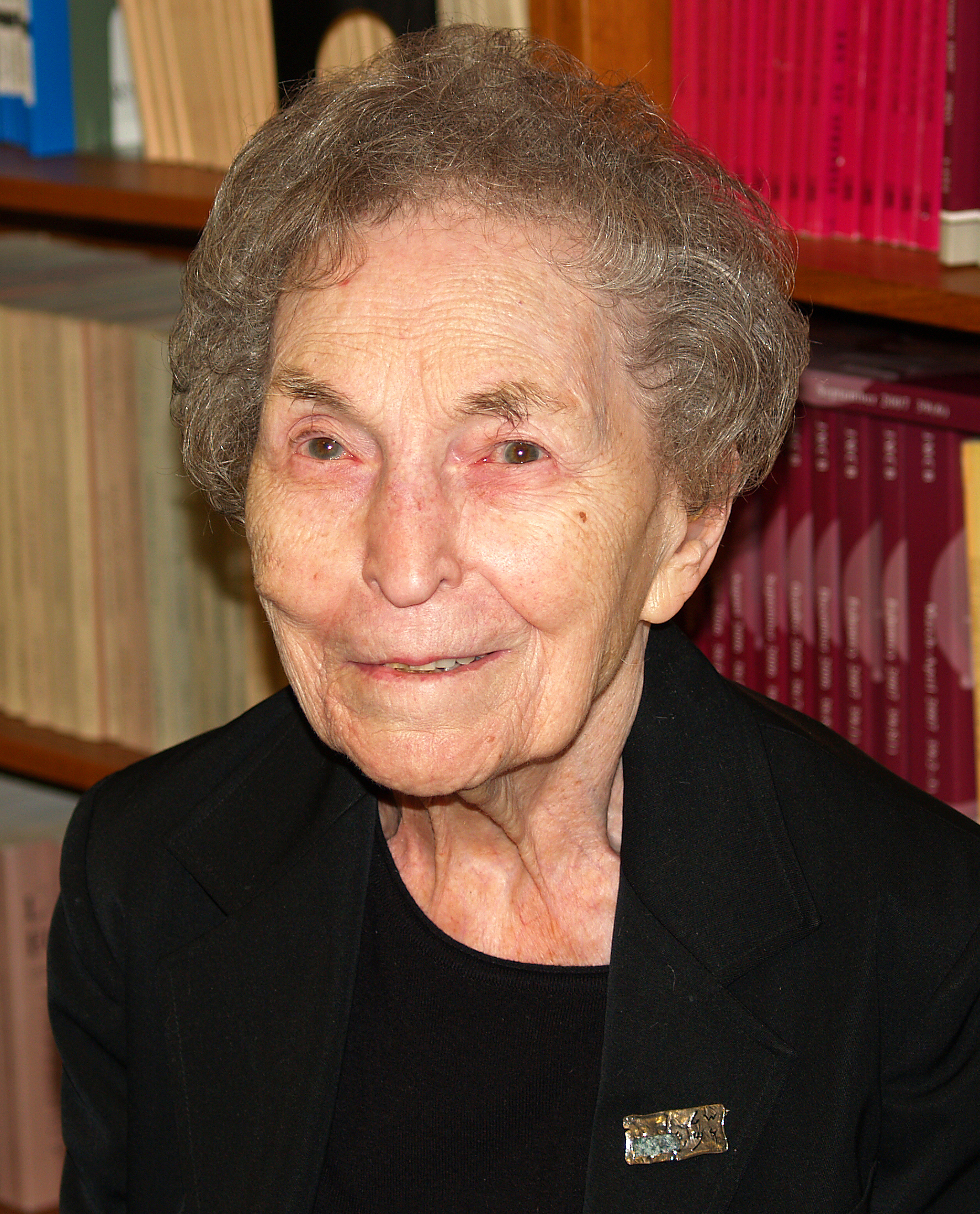
- Schwartz in 2007
- Born: Anna Jacobson; November 11, 1915; New York City, New York, U.S.
- Died: June 21, 2012 (aged 96); Manhattan, New York City, New York, U.S.
- Spouse(s): Isaac Schwartz (1936–1999; his death)
- Relatives: Abraham Halkin (cousin) Simon Halkin (cousin) Leon Gordis (cousin)

Academic background
- Education: Barnard College; Columbia University
- Influences: Milton Friedman

Academic work
- Discipline: Monetary economics
- School or tradition: Chicago school of economics
- Institutions: National Bureau of Economic Research
- Notable ideas: Analysis of money Analysis of banking
- Website: Information at IDEAS / RePEc

Anna Jacobson Schwartz (pronounced /ʃwɔːrts/ SHWORTS; November 11, 1915 – June 21, 2012) was an American economist and monetary historian who worked at the National Bureau of Economic Research for more than seven decades. Paul Krugman has said that Schwartz is "one of the world's greatest monetary scholars."

Schwartz collaborated with Nobel laureate Milton Friedman on A Monetary History of the United States, 1867–1960, which was published in 1963. This book placed the blame for the Great Depression at the door of the Federal Reserve System. Robert J. Shiller describes the book as the "most influential account" of the Great Depression. She was also president of the Western Economic Association International in 1988.

Schwartz was inducted into the National Women's Hall of Fame in 2013.

== Early life and education ==
Schwartz was born Anna Jacobson on November 11, 1915, in New York City to Pauline (née Shainmark) and Hillel Jacobson. She graduated Phi Beta Kappa from Barnard College at 18 and gained her master's degree in economics from Columbia University in 1935, at 19. She started her career as a professional economist one year later.

In 1936, she married Isaac Schwartz, a financial officer and fellow Columbia University graduate, with whom she raised four children. Her first published paper was in the Review of Economics and Statistics (1940), in which she, along with Arthur Gayer and Isaiah Finkelstein, wrote British Share Prices, 1811–1850. She earned her Ph.D. from Columbia in 1964.

== National Bureau of Economic Research ==
After briefly working for the U.S. Department of Agriculture (1936) and the Columbia University Social Science Research Council (1936–41); in 1941, she joined the staff of the National Bureau of Economic Research. She worked in the New York City office of that organization for the rest of her life. When she joined the National Bureau, it was engaged in the study of business cycles. In 1981 her role as the staff director of the U.S. Gold Commission brought her public recognition. Even after a broken hip and stroke in 2009, Schwartz remained an astute and thorough researcher. She was named a distinguished fellow of the American Economic Association (1993) and a fellow of the American Academy of Arts and Sciences (2007).

Though she held teaching positions for only a short part of her career, she developed younger scholars by her willingness to work with them and to share her approach (a scrupulous examination of the past) to understand history better and to draw lessons for the present.

== Growth and Fluctuation of the British Economy ==
In collaboration with Arthur Gayer and Walt Whitman Rostow, she produced the monumental The Growth and Fluctuation of the British Economy, 1790–1850: An Historical, Statistical, and Theoretical Study of Britain's Economic Development. It appeared in two volumes in 1953, having been delayed by the Second World War for a decade after it was completed. It is still highly regarded among economic scholars of the period. It was reprinted in 1975.

Gayer had died before the book's first appearance, but two other authors wrote a new introduction, which reviewed literature on the subject that had published since the original publication date. They admitted that there had developed what they called an "amicable divergence of view" about the interpretation of some of the facts that were set out in the book. In particular, Schwartz indicated that she had, in the light of recent theoretical and empirical research, revised her view of the importance of monetary policy and her interpretation of interest rate movements.

== Research with Friedman ==
Years before her first book was reprinted, another economist had joined what might be called the Schwartz team of co-authors. Prompted by Arthur F. Burns, then at Columbia University and the National Bureau who would subsequently be Chairman of the U.S. Federal Reserve System, she and Milton Friedman teamed up to examine the role of money in the business cycle. Their first publication was A Monetary History of the United States, 1867–1960, which hypothesized that changes in monetary policy have had large effects on the economy, and it laid a large portion of the blame for the Great Depression at the door of the Federal Reserve System.

The book was published in 1963, along with the equally famous article, "Money and Business Cycles", which as with her first paper was published in the Review of Economics and Statistics. They also wrote the books Monetary Statistics of the United States (1970) and Monetary Trends in the United States and the United Kingdom: Their Relation to Income, Prices, and Interest Rates, 1867–1975 (1982).

The Depression-related chapter of A Monetary History was titled "The Great Contraction" and was republished as a separate book in 1965. Some editions include an appendix in which the authors got an endorsement from an unlikely source at an event in their honor when Ben Bernanke made this statement:

"Let me end my talk by abusing slightly my status as an official representative of the Federal Reserve. I would like to say to Milton and Anna: Regarding the Great Depression, you're right. We did it. We're very sorry. But thanks to you, we won't do it again."

== Financial regulation ==
She changed her opinion on financial regulation. Economists, bankers, and policymakers have long been concerned with the stability of the financial system. In a series of studies in the 1970s and 1980s, Schwartz emphasized that price level stability is essential for financial system stability.

Drawing on evidence from over two centuries, she demonstrated that business failures do not have major consequences for the economy if their effects are prevented from spreading through the financial system. Individual institutions should also be allowed to fail, not supported with taxpayers' money. In 1981, she gained public recognition for her role as staff director of the U.S. Gold Commission.

== Other areas of work ==
There have been other areas of her work including the international transmission of inflation and of business cycles, the role of government in monetary policy, measuring the output of banks, and the behavior of interest rates, on deflation, on monetary standards. In an interview with Barrons in 2008, Schwartz said interventions such as injecting liquidity into markets and reacting to the credit crisis with ad hoc programs were not the answer. She has also done work outside of the United States. Some years ago, the Department of Banking and Finance at City University, London, England, started a research project on the monetary history of the United Kingdom. For many years, she was an adviser to that project. She commented on papers, suggested lines of approach, came and spoke to students and at academic conferences where the work was discussed.

== Later work ==
From 2002 to 2003, she served as president of the International Atlantic Economic Society. She was elected a Fellow of the American Academy of Arts and Sciences in 2007. After 2007, she concentrated her efforts on researching U.S. official intervention in the foreign exchange market using Federal Reserve data from 1962.

She continued commenting on economic affairs until the 2008 financial crisis, and criticized the government's response to it, such as Ben Bernanke's support for bailouts and persistently-low interest rates. She also addressed a critique of Friedman by Krugman. In addition, she wrote 9 books in her career, and published over 100 academic articles or comments.

== Personal life ==
She died on June 21, 2012, in her home in Manhattan, New York, aged 96. Her husband Isaac predeceased her in 1999; they had been married for over 60 years. She was survived by four children (Jonathan, Joel, Naomi Pasachoff and Paula Berggren) as well as seven grandchildren and six great-grandchildren.

Her son-in-law was astronomer Jay Pasachoff.

== Honorary degrees ==
- University of Florida (1987)
- Stonehill College, Massachusetts (1989)
- Iona College (1992)
- Rutgers University (1998)
- Emory University (2000); City University of New York Graduate Center (2000)
- Williams College (2002)
- Loyola University Chicago, 2003
- City University Business School, London (2006)

== Books ==
- Monetary History of the United States, 1867–1960 (with Milton Friedman), 1963 ISBN 0691003548
- Monetary Statistics of the United States: Estimates, Sources, Methods (with Milton Friedman), 1970 ISBN 0870142100
- Growth and Fluctuations in the British Economy, 1790–1850: An Historical, Statistical, and Theoretical Study of Britain's Economic Development (with Arthur Gayer and Walt Whitman Rostow), 1953 ISBN 0064923444
- Money in Historical Perspective (with an introduction by Michael D. Bordo and Milton Friedman), 1987 ISBN 0226742288
