= A Monetary History of the United States =

1963 book by Milton Friedman and Anna Schwartz

A Monetary History of the United States, 1867–1960
- Dust jacket of 1st edition, 3rd printing
- Author: Milton Friedman, Anna Schwartz
- Language: English
- Subject: Economic history
- Genre: History
- Published: 1963; Princeton University Press
- Publication place: United States
- Media type: Print (hardcover)
- Pages: 860 pp (first edition)
- OCLC: 258805
- Dewey Decimal: 332.4973
- LC Class: HG538.F86 1963

A Monetary History of the United States, 1867–1960 is a book written in 1963 by future Nobel Prize-winning economists Anna Schwartz and Milton Friedman. It uses historical time series and economic analysis to argue the then-novel proposition that changes in the money supply profoundly influenced the United States economy, especially the behavior of economic fluctuations. The implication they draw is that changes in the money supply had unintended adverse effects, and that sound monetary policy is necessary for economic stability. Orthodox economic historians see it as one of the most influential economics books of the century. The chapter dealing with the causes of the Great Depression was published as a standalone book titled The Great Contraction, 1929–1933.

== Authorship ==
Friedman and Schwartz were working at the National Bureau of Economic Research (NBER) when Arthur Burns, the future chairman of the Federal Reserve, suggested that they collaborate on a project to analyze the effect of the money supply on the business cycle. Schwartz was already gathering much of the relevant historical data at that point, while Friedman was already a professor at the University of Chicago and also at the NBER. They began work in the late 1940s and eventually published A Monetary History through Princeton University Press in 1963. The Great Depression-related chapter, "The Great Contraction", was republished as a separate book in 1965.

== Content ==
The book discusses the role of the monetary policy in the U.S. economy from the Civil War Reconstruction Era to the middle of the 20th century. It presents what was then a contrarian view of the role of monetary policy in the Great Depression. The prevalent view in the early 1960s was that monetary forces played a passive role in the economic contraction of the 1930s. The Monetary History argues that the bank failures and the massive withdrawals of currency from the financial system that followed significantly shrank the money supply (the total amount of currency and outstanding bank deposits), which greatly exacerbated the economic contraction. The book criticizes the Federal Reserve for not keeping the supply of money steady and not acting as lender of last resort, instead allowing commercial banks to fail and allowing the economic depression to deepen.

== Themes ==
The book's main theme is the money supply. It tracks this through three numbers:

- the ratio of cash that people hold in their checking deposits (when people trust banks, they deposit more of their money);
- the ratio of bank deposits to bank reserves (when banks feel safer, they loan out more of their money); and
- high-powered money (that is, anything that serves as cash or reserves).

The money supply (cash plus deposits) can be computed from these three numbers. The supply shrinks when people withdraw money from the bank, banks hold more reserves, or high-powered money leaves the country (e.g. gold is exported). During a crisis, all three can happen.

Another theme of the book is gold. For the time period, it was the unit used for international trade with Europe, so even when the United States is not on the gold standard (that is, paper money could be exchanged for bullion and international trade was settled immediately with gold), it plays a significant role. The authors write that the United States was on the gold standard from 1879 to 1923. From 1923 to 1933, the authors argue that international trade was "sterilized" by the Federal Reserve inflating the money rather than immediately being settled by gold. Lastly, they term the period from 1934 to 1960 (when the book was published) as a "managed standard". Paper money cannot be exchanged for bullion, and the authors compare gold to a subsidized commodity like grain.

Another book's theme is silver. China and Mexico used it for their currency and the United States used it for smaller coins. From 1879 to 1897, there was a populist push (bimetallism) to switch the gold-backed dollar to silver. The United States Department of the Treasury bought silver but that did not help when the country was on gold. Later during the Great Depression, the United States bought silver at inflated prices to help silver miners. According to Friedman and Schwartz, the result was tragic for the money supplies of China and Mexico.

In their book, the authors measure the velocity of money. While discussing this significantly, they ultimately did not make any conclusions about it. Lastly, another theme of the book is the decision making at the Federal Reserve. The authors also try to find out the people making the decisions and what information they had, perhaps just as important is the decision-making process. The Federal Reserve Bank of New York initially led the decision-making process but eventually migrated to the Federal Reserve Board in Washington, D.C. To a lesser extent, the United States Secretary of the Treasury's decisions were included.

== Thesis ==
The thesis of Monetary History is that the money supply affects the economy. In the final chapter, they specify three occasions where the Federal Reserve acted strongly during relatively calm times and present these as an experiment for the reader to judge their thesis. The three actions by the Federal Reserve were the raising the discount rate in 1920, the raise of it in 1931, and the raise of the reserve requirement in 1937. Each of these actions caused a large contraction of the money supply over the next 12 months (9%, 14%, and 3%). In fact, these were the three sharpest declines they saw in their data. In those 12 months, industrial production fell dramatically (30%, 24%, and 34%), and other metrics fell at similar rates. These were three of the six worst 12-month periods for industrial production. The others were 1929−1931 (the Great Depression) and 1945, when the economy switched from wartime to peacetime production. Having demonstrated their thesis, they can now use it and argue that the Great Depression was due to the Federal Reserve letting the money supply shrink from 1929 to 1933.

== Great Depression ==
Friedman and Schwartz identified four main policy mistakes made by the Federal Reserve that led to a sharp and undesirable decline in the money supply:

- In the spring of 1928, the Federal Reserve began to tighten its monetary policy (resulting in rising interest rates) and continued that same policy until the Wall Street Crash of 1929. This tight monetary policy caused the economy to enter a recession in mid-1929 and triggered the stock market crash a few months later.
- In the fall of 1931, it raised interest rates to defend the dollar in response to speculative attacks, ignoring the difficulties this caused to domestic commercial banks.
- After lowering interest rates early in 1932 with positive results, it raised interest rates again in late 1932, causing a further collapse in the United States economy.
- The Federal Reserve was also to be blamed for a pattern of ongoing neglect of problems in the United States banking sector throughout the early 1930s. It failed to create a stable domestic banking environment by supporting the domestic banks and acting as lender of last resort to domestic banks during banking panics.

== Influence ==
The book was the first to present the then novel argument that excessively tight monetary policy by the Federal Reserve following the boom of the 1920s turned an otherwise normal recession into the Great Depression of the 1930s. Previously, the consensus of economists was that loss of investor and consumer confidence following the Wall Street Crash of 1929 was a primary cause of the Great Depression.

The Monetary History was lauded as one of the most influential economics books of the 20th century by the Cato Institute book forum in 2003. It was also cited with approval in a 2002 speech by then-Federal Reserve board member Ben Bernanke stating "the direct and indirect influences of the Monetary History on contemporary monetary economics would be difficult to overstate", and again in a 2004 speech as "transform[ing] the debate about the Great Depression".

The Great Depression-related chapter of A Monetary History was titled "The Great Contraction" and was republished as a separate book in 1965. Some editions include an appendix, in which the authors got an endorsement from an unlikely source at an event in their honor when Bernanke made this statement:

"Let me end my talk by abusing slightly my status as an official representative of the Federal Reserve. I would like to say to Milton and Anna: Regarding the Great Depression, you're right. We did it. We're very sorry. But thanks to you, we won't do it again."

Monetarist economists used the work of Friedman and Schwartz to justify their positions for using monetary policy as the critical economic stabilizer. This view became more popular as Keynesian stabilizers failed to ameliorate the stagflation of the 1970s and political winds shifted away from government intervention in the market into the 1980s and 1990s.

== Criticism ==
The book lays most of the blame for the Great Depression upon the Federal Reserve, arguing that it did not do enough to prevent the Depression. Economists such as Peter Temin raised questions about whether or not most monetary quantity levels were endogenous rather than exogenously determined as A Monetary History argues, especially during the Depression. Paul Krugman argues that the 2008 financial crisis has shown that, during a financial crisis, central banks cannot control broad money, and that money supply bears little relationship to the GDP. According to Krugman, the same was true in the 1930s, and the claim that the Federal Reserve could have prevented the Great Depression is thus highly dubious.

Some economists have challenged this view, arguing that the observed breakdown in the money-GDP relationship may reflect measurement problems rather than a fundamental structural change. Traditional monetary aggregates treat all monetary assets as perfect substitutes regardless of their liquidity characteristics, potentially failing to capture true monetary services during periods of financial innovation and crisis. Studies using alternative measurement approaches, such as Divisia monetary aggregates that weight assets according to their liquidity services, have found more stable relationships between money demand and economic variables. This research suggests that instabilities in money demand may reflect how monetary aggregates are constructed rather than changes in economic behavior.

In The Golden Fetters, economic historian Barry Eichengreen argued that because of the then internationally prevailing gold exchange standard, the Federal Reserve's hands were tied. According to Eichengreen, in order to maintain the credibility of the gold standard, the Federal Reserve could not undertake actions (such as drastically increasing the money supply) in the manner advocated by Friedman and Schwartz. James Tobin, while appreciating the rigor with which Friedman and Schwartz demonstrated the importance of the monetary supply, questioned their measures of the velocity of money and how informative this measure of the frequency of monetary transactions really is in order to understand the macroeconomic fluctuations of the early-to-mid 20th century.

Murray Rothbard, an Austrian School and anarcho-capitalist economist, argued that the money supply actually increased during the time period where Friedman claimed the Federal Reserve contracted the money supply. He used this argument to say that the Great Depression was a manifestation of the Austrian business cycle theory. Both Rothbard and Friedman held the belief that the Great Depression was a result of the Federal Reserve.
