= Rose Friedman =

American economist (1910–2009)

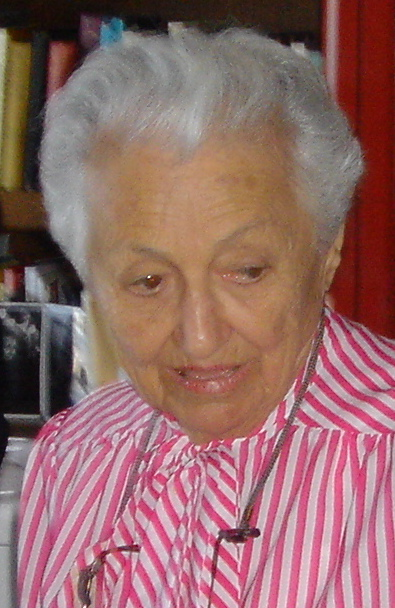
- Friedman in 2004
- Born: Rose Director; 30 December 1910; Staryi Chortoryisk, Volhynian Governorate, Russian Empire (now Ukraine)
- Died: 18 August 2009 (aged 98); Davis, California, U.S.
- Other name: Rose D. Friedman
- Education: Reed College; University of Chicago
- Occupation: Economist
- Spouse: Milton Friedman (m. 1936; died 2006)
- Children: David D. Friedman; Jan Martel

Rose Director Friedman /dɪˈrɛktər ˈfriːdmən/; born Rose Director (30 December 1910 – 18 August 2009) was an American free-market economist and co-founder of the Milton and Rose D. Friedman Foundation.

== Early life and education ==
Rose Director was born in Staryi Chortoryisk, in Ukraine, to the Director family, prominent Jewish residents. She is believed to have been born the last week of December 1910; however, the birth records have been lost. Her brother, Aaron Director (1901–2004), was a professor at the University of Chicago Law School and one of the founders of the economic analysis of law. In her youth, she wrote articles with Dorothy Brady on consumption.

Rose Friedman attended Reed College and then transferred to the University of Chicago, where she received a Bachelor of Philosophy degree. After this she began to study for a doctorate in economics at the University of Chicago and completed all work necessary for the PhD except for writing the dissertation.

== Career ==
External videos
- Presentation by Milton and Rose Friedman on Two Lucky People: Memoirs, August 14, 1998, C-SPAN

With Milton, she co-wrote two books on economics and public policy, Free to Choose and Tyranny of the Status Quo, and their memoirs Two Lucky People, which appeared in 1998. Together they founded EdChoice (formerly the Milton and Rose D. Friedman Foundation), with the aim of promoting the use of school vouchers and freedom of choice in education. She also co-produced the PBS television series, Free to Choose, and assisted her husband in writing his 1962 political philosophy book Capitalism and Freedom.

She received an honorary LL.D. in December 1986 from Pepperdine University.

When Milton received his Medal of Freedom in 1988, President Ronald Reagan said jokingly in his speech that Rose was known for being the only person to ever have won an argument against Milton. The Friedmans had two children, Janet and David.

== Personal life and death ==
Friedman was married to her frequent collaborator, Milton Friedman (1912–2006), who won the 1976 Nobel Prize in Economics. She died in Davis, California on 18 August 2009, at the age of 98.
