= Milton Friedman =

American economist and statistician (1912–2006)

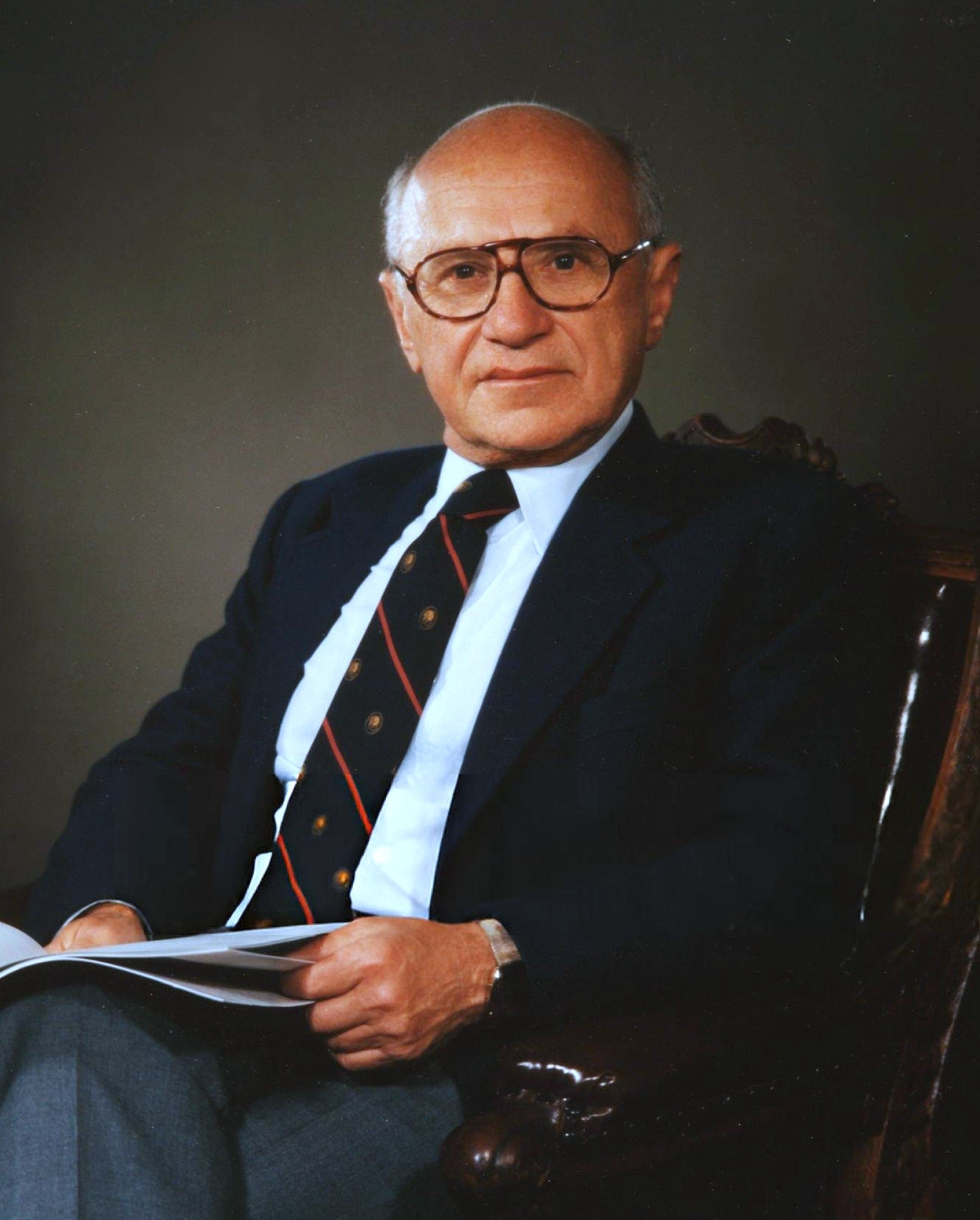
- Friedman in 1986
- Born: July 31, 1912; New York City, U.S.
- Died: November 16, 2006 (aged 94); San Francisco, California, U.S.
- Political party: Republican
- Spouse: Rose Friedman (m. 1936)
- Children: David D. Friedman; Jan Martel

Academic background
- Education: Rutgers University (BA); University of Chicago (MA); Columbia University (PhD)
- Doctoral advisor: Simon Kuznets
- Influences: Bentham; Burns; George; Hayek; Hotelling; H. Jones; Knight; Kuznets; Schultz; H.C. Simons; Smith; Marx; Keynes; Stigler; Viner

Academic work
- Discipline: Macroeconomics
- School or tradition: Chicago School; Classical liberalism
- Institutions: National Resources Planning Board (1935–1937); National Bureau of Economic Research (1937–1940); Columbia University (1937–1941; 1943–1945; 1964–1965); University of Wisconsin, Madison (1940); U.S. Department of the Treasury (1941–1943); University of Chicago (1946–1977); University of Cambridge (1954–1955); Hoover Institution, Stanford University (1977–2006)
- Doctoral students: Phillip Cagan; Harry Markowitz; Lester G. Telser; David I. Meiselman; Neil Wallace; Miguel Sidrauski; Edgar L. Feige; Thomas Sowell
- Notable ideas: Cost-push inflation; Floating exchange rates; Helicopter money; Price theory; Monetarism; Applied macroeconomics; Natural rate of unemployment; Permanent income hypothesis; Volunteer military; Friedman doctrine; Friedman rule; Friedman test; Friedman's k-percent rule; Friedman–Savage utility function
- Awards: Member of the American Philosophical Society (1957); Member of the National Academy of Sciences (1973); National Medal of Science (1988); Presidential Medal of Freedom (1988); Nobel Memorial Prize in Economic Sciences (1976); John Bates Clark Medal (1951)
- Website: Information at IDEAS / RePEc

Milton Friedman (/ˈfriːdmən/; July 31, 1912 – November 16, 2006) was an American economist and statistician who received the 1976 Nobel Memorial Prize in Economic Sciences for his research on consumption analysis, monetary history and theory and the complexity of stabilization policy. With George Stigler, Friedman was among the intellectual leaders of the Chicago school of economics, a neoclassical school of economic thought associated with the faculty at the University of Chicago that rejected Keynesianism in favor of monetarism before shifting their focus to new classical macroeconomics in the mid-1970s. Several students, young professors and academics who were recruited or mentored by Friedman at Chicago went on to become leading economists, including Nobel laureates Gary Becker (1992), Robert Fogel (1993), and Robert Lucas Jr. (1995).

Friedman's challenges to what he called "naive Keynesian theory" began with his interpretation of consumption, which tracks how consumers spend. He introduced the permanent income hypothesis, a theory which would later become part of mainstream economics and he was among the first to propagate the theory of consumption smoothing. During the 1960s, he became the main advocate opposing both Marxist and Keynesian government and economic policies, and described his approach (along with mainstream economics) as using "Keynesian language and apparatus" yet rejecting its initial conclusions. He theorized that there existed a natural rate of unemployment and argued that unemployment below this rate would cause inflation to accelerate. (Note: Among macroeconomists, the "natural" rate has been increasingly replaced by James Tobin's non-accelerating inflation rate of unemployment (NAIRU), which is seen as having fewer normative connotations.) He argued that the Phillips curve was in the long run vertical at the "natural rate" and predicted what would come to be known as stagflation. Friedman promoted a macroeconomic viewpoint known as monetarism and argued that a steady, small expansion of the money supply was the preferred policy, as compared to rapid and unexpected changes. His ideas concerning monetary policy, taxation, privatization, and deregulation influenced government policies, especially during the 1980s. His monetary theory influenced the Federal Reserve's monetary policy in response to the 2008 financial crisis.

After retiring from the University of Chicago in 1977, and becoming emeritus professor in economics in 1983, Friedman served as an advisor to Republican U.S. president Ronald Reagan and Conservative British prime minister Margaret Thatcher. His political philosophy extolled the virtues of a free market economic system with minimal government intervention in social matters. In his 1962 book Capitalism and Freedom, Friedman advocated policies such as a volunteer military, freely floating exchange rates, abolition of medical licenses, a negative income tax, school vouchers, and opposition to the war on drugs and support for drug liberalization policies. His support for school choice led him to found the Friedman Foundation for Educational Choice, later renamed EdChoice.

Friedman's works cover a broad range of economic topics and public policy issues. His books and essays have had global influence, including in former communist states. A 2011 survey of economists commissioned by the EJW ranked Friedman as the second-most popular economist of the 20th century, following only John Maynard Keynes. Upon his death, The Economist described him as "the most influential economist of the second half of the 20th century ... possibly of all of it".

== Early life ==
Friedman was born in Brooklyn, New York City, on July 31, 1912. His parents, Sára Ethel (née Landau) and Jenő Saul Friedman, were Jewish working-class immigrants from Beregszász in Carpathian Ruthenia, Kingdom of Hungary (now Berehove in Ukraine). They emigrated to the United States in their early teens. They both worked as dry goods merchants. Milton was the youngest of four children and only son. Shortly after his birth, the family relocated to Rahway, New Jersey. Friedman's father died during Friedman's senior year of high school, leaving Friedman and two older sisters to care for their mother.

In his early teens, Friedman was injured in a car accident, which scarred his upper lip. A talented student and an avid reader, Friedman graduated from Rahway High School in 1928, just before his 16th birthday. He was the first in his family to attend a university. Friedman was awarded a competitive scholarship to Rutgers University and graduated in 1932.

Friedman initially intended to become an actuary or mathematician, however, the state of the economy, which was at this point in a depression, convinced him to become an economist. He was offered two scholarships to do graduate work, one in mathematics at Brown University and the other in economics at the University of Chicago. Friedman chose the latter, earning a Master of Arts degree in 1933. He was strongly influenced by Jacob Viner, Frank Knight, and Henry Simons. Friedman met his future wife, economist Rose Director, while at the University of Chicago.

During the 1933–1934 academic year, he had a fellowship at Columbia University, where he studied statistics with statistician and economist Harold Hotelling. He was back in Chicago for the 1934–1935 academic year, working as a research assistant for Henry Schultz, who was then working on Theory and Measurement of Demand.

During the 1934–1935 academic year, Friedman formed what would later prove to be lifetime friendships with George Stigler and W. Allen Wallis, both of whom later taught with Friedman at the University of Chicago. Friedman was also influenced by two lifelong friends, Arthur Burns and Homer Johnson. They helped Friedman better understand the depth of economic thinking.

== Public service ==
Friedman was unable to find academic employment, so in 1935 he followed his friend W. Allen Wallis to Washington, D.C., where Franklin D. Roosevelt's New Deal was "a lifesaver" for many young economists. At this stage, Friedman said he and his wife "regarded the job-creation programs such as the WPA, CCC, and PWA appropriate responses to the critical situation", but not "the price- and wage-fixing measures of the National Recovery Administration and the Agricultural Adjustment Administration". Foreshadowing his later ideas, he believed price controls interfered with an essential signaling mechanism to help resources be used where they were most valued. Indeed, Friedman later concluded that all government intervention associated with the New Deal was "the wrong cure for the wrong disease", arguing the Federal Reserve was to blame, and that they should have expanded the money supply in reaction to what he later described in A Monetary History of the United States as "The Great Contraction". Later, Friedman and his colleague Anna Schwartz wrote A Monetary History of the United States, 1867–1960, which argued that the Great Depression was caused by a severe monetary contraction due to banking crises and poor policy on the part of the Federal Reserve. Robert J. Shiller describes the book as the "most influential account" of the Great Depression. During 1935, he began working for the National Resources Planning Board, which was then working on a large consumer budget survey. Ideas from this project later became a part of his Theory of the Consumption Function, a book which first described consumption smoothing and the permanent income hypothesis. Friedman began employment with the National Bureau of Economic Research during the autumn of 1937 to assist Simon Kuznets in his work on professional income. This work resulted in their jointly authored publication Incomes from Independent Professional Practice, which introduced the concepts of permanent and transitory income, a major component of the permanent income hypothesis that Friedman worked out in greater detail in the 1950s. The book hypothesizes that professional licensing artificially restricts the supply of services and raises prices.

Incomes from Independent Professional Practice remained quite controversial within the economics community because of Friedman's hypothesis that barriers to entry, which were exercised and enforced by the American Medical Association, led to higher than average wages for physicians, compared to other professional groups. Barriers to entry are a fixed cost which must be incurred regardless of any outside factors such as work experience, or other factors of human capital.

During 1940, Friedman was appointed as an assistant professor teaching economics at the University of Wisconsin–Madison, but encountered antisemitism in the Economics department and returned to government service. From 1941 to 1943 Friedman worked on wartime tax policy for the federal government, as an advisor to senior officials of the United States Department of the Treasury. As a Treasury spokesman during 1942, he advocated a Keynesian policy of taxation. He helped to invent the payroll withholding tax system, since the federal government needed money to fund the war. He later said, "I have no apologies for it, but I really wish we hadn't found it necessary and I wish there were some way of abolishing withholding now." In Milton and Rose Friedman's jointly written memoir, he wrote, "Rose has repeatedly chided me over the years about the role that I played in making possible the current overgrown government we both criticize so strongly."

== Academic career ==
=== Early years ===
In 1940, Friedman accepted a position at the University of Wisconsin–Madison, but left because of differences with faculty regarding United States involvement in World War II. Friedman believed the United States should enter the war. In 1943, Friedman joined the Division of War Research at Columbia University (headed by W. Allen Wallis and Harold Hotelling), where he spent the rest of World War II working as a mathematical statistician, focusing on problems of weapons design, military tactics, and metallurgical experiments. He was a member of the Statistical Research Group. He was consulted during the Battle of the Bulge as an expert on the proximity fuzes of air burst shells.

In 1945, Friedman submitted Incomes from Independent Professional Practice (co-authored with Kuznets and completed during 1940) to Columbia as his doctoral dissertation. The university awarded him a PhD in 1946. Friedman spent the 1945–1946 academic year teaching at the University of Minnesota (where his friend George Stigler was employed). On February 12, 1945, his only son, David D. Friedman, who would later follow in his father's footsteps as an economist, was born.

=== University of Chicago ===
In 1946, Friedman accepted an offer to teach economic theory at the University of Chicago (a position opened by the departure of his former professor Jacob Viner to Princeton University). Friedman would work for the University of Chicago for the next 30 years. There, he contributed to the establishment of an intellectual community that produced a number of Nobel Memorial Prize winners, known collectively as the Chicago school of economics.

At the time, Arthur F. Burns, who was then the head of the National Bureau of Economic Research, and later chairman of the Federal Reserve, asked Friedman to rejoin the Bureau's staff. He accepted the invitation, and assumed responsibility for the Bureau's inquiry into the role of money in the business cycle. As a result, he initiated the "Workshop in Money and Banking" (the "Chicago Workshop"), which promoted a revival of monetary studies. During the latter half of the 1940s, Friedman began a collaboration with Anna Schwartz, an economic historian at the Bureau, that would ultimately result in the 1963 publication of a book co-authored by Friedman and Schwartz, A Monetary History of the United States, 1867–1960.

In 1951, Friedman was awarded the John Bates Clark Medal, which at the time was awarded every other year to the best economist under the age of 40, by the American Economic Association.

=== University of Cambridge ===
Friedman spent the 1954–1955 academic year as a Fulbright Visiting Fellow at Gonville and Caius College, Cambridge. At the time, the Cambridge economics faculty was divided into a Keynesian majority (including Joan Robinson and Richard Kahn) and an anti-Keynesian minority (headed by Dennis Robertson). Friedman speculated he was invited to the fellowship because his views were unacceptable to both of the Cambridge factions. Later his weekly columns for Newsweek magazine (1966–84) were well read and increasingly influential among political and business people, and helped earn the magazine a Gerald Loeb Special Award in 1968. From 1968 to 1978, he and Paul Samuelson participated in the Economics Cassette Series, a biweekly subscription series where the economist would discuss the days' issues for about a half-hour at a time.

==== A Theory of the Consumption Function ====
One of Milton Friedman's most popular works, A Theory of the Consumption Function, challenged traditional Keynesian viewpoints about the household. This work was originally published in 1957 by Princeton University Press, and it reanalyzed the relationship displayed "between aggregate consumption or aggregate savings and aggregate income".

Friedman's counterpart Keynes believed people would modify their household consumption expenditures to relate to their existing income levels. Friedman's research introduced the term "permanent income" to the world, which was the average of a household's expected income over several years, and he also developed the permanent income hypothesis. Friedman thought income consisted of several components, namely transitory and permanent. He established the formula $y=y_p+y_t$ to calculate income, with p representing the permanent component, and t representing the transitory component. Milton Friedman's research changed how economists interpreted the consumption function, and his work pushed the idea that current income was not the only factor affecting people's adjustment household consumption expenditures. Instead, expected income levels also affected how households would change their consumption expenditures. Friedman's contributions strongly influenced research on consumer behavior, and he further defined how to predict consumption smoothing, which contradicts Keynes' marginal propensity to consume. Although this work presented many controversial points of view which differed from existing viewpoints established by Keynes, A Theory of the Consumption Function helped Friedman gain respect in the field of economics. His work on the permanent income hypothesis is among the many contributions which were listed as reasons for his Sveriges-Riksbank Prize in Economic Sciences. His work was later expanded on by Christopher D. Carroll, especially in regards to the absence of liquidity constraints.

The permanent income hypothesis faces some criticism, mainly from Keynesian economists. The primary criticism of the hypothesis is based on a lack of liquidity constraints.

==== A Monetary History of the United States ====
A Monetary History of the United States, which he co-authored with Anna J. Schwartz, was the second major book published by Milton Friedman, released in 1963. In this book, Friedman discusses how the changes in the money supply caused major economic crises. Friedman and Schwartz used historical data and economic analysis to demonstrate that large changes in the money supply affected the U.S. economy significantly. They further asserted that changes in the money supply can lead to adverse consequences, and good monetary policies are essential for achieving economic stability. In the book, the authors explained the role of the Federal Reserve in the Great Depression. They claimed that the Federal Reserve's policy of responding to the supposed imperatives of the Gold Standard was unnecessarily conservative and that the consequent failure to maintain a stable supply of money caused deflation between 1930 and 1933, driving many commercial banks to fail, and was the main reason the Great Depression occurred. This book changed the way economists think about recession and was influential in the development of monetarism. It also inspired lots of policymakers and guided them to make modern monetary policies.

==== Capitalism and Freedom ====
His book Capitalism and Freedom, inspired by a series of lectures he gave at Wabash College, brought him national and international attention outside academia. It was published in 1962 by the University of Chicago Press and consists of essays that used non-mathematical economic models to explore issues of public policy. It sold over 400,000 copies in the first eighteen years and more than half a million since 1962. Capitalism and Freedom was translated into eighteen languages. Friedman talks about the need to move to a classically liberal society, that free markets would help nations and individuals in the long-run and fix the efficiency problems currently faced by the United States and other major countries of the 1950s and 1960s. He goes through the chapters specifying an issue in each respective chapter from the role of government and money supply to social welfare programs to a special chapter on occupational licensure. Friedman concludes Capitalism and Freedom with his "classical liberal" stance that government should stay out of matters that do not need it and should only involve itself when absolutely necessary for the survival of its people and the country. He recounts how the best of a country's abilities come from its free markets while its failures come from government intervention.

== Post-retirement ==
Friedman giving a lecture about a pencil in Free to Choose (1980)

In 1977, at the age of 65, Friedman retired from the University of Chicago after teaching there for 30 years. He and his wife moved to San Francisco, where he became a visiting scholar at the Federal Reserve Bank of San Francisco. From 1977 on, he was affiliated with the Hoover Institution at Stanford University.

During 1977, Friedman was approached by Bob Chitester and the Free to Choose Network. They asked him to create a television program presenting his economic and social philosophy.

Friedman and his wife Rose worked on this project for the next three years, and during 1980, the ten-part series, titled Free to Choose, was broadcast by the Public Broadcasting Service (PBS). The companion book to the series (co-authored by Milton and his wife, Rose Friedman), also titled Free To Choose, was the bestselling nonfiction book of 1980.

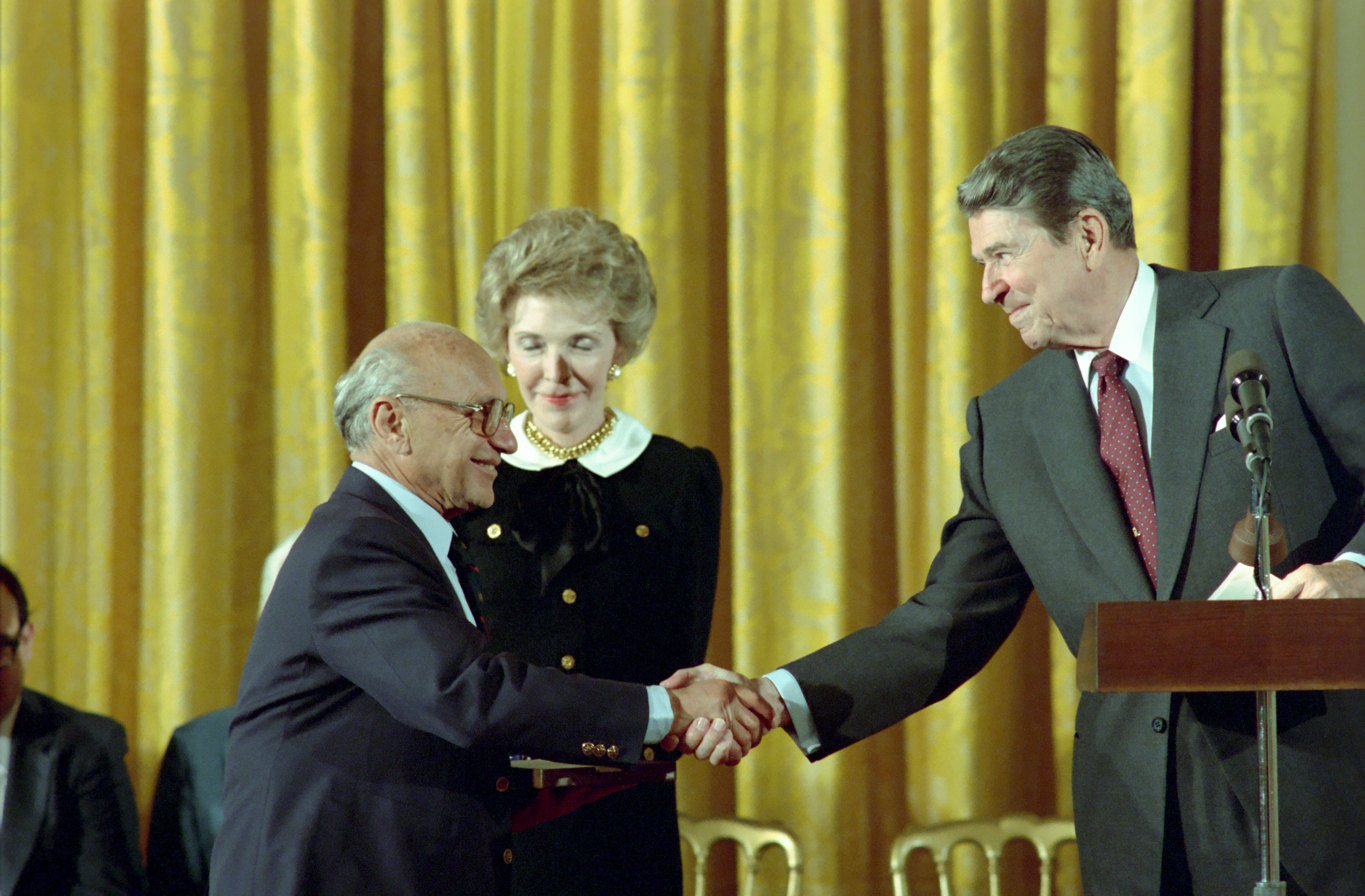
Friedman receiving the Presidential Medal of Freedom from Ronald Reagan in 1988

Friedman served as an unofficial adviser to Ronald Reagan during his 1980 presidential campaign, and then served on the President's Economic Policy Advisory Board for the rest of the Reagan Administration. Ebenstein says Friedman was "the 'guru' of the Reagan administration". In 1988, he received the National Medal of Science and Reagan honored him with the Presidential Medal of Freedom.

Friedman is known now as one of the most influential economists of the 20th century. Throughout the 1980s and 1990s, Friedman continued to write editorials and appear on television. He made several visits to Eastern Europe and to China, where he also advised governments. He was also for many years a Trustee of the Philadelphia Society.

== Personal life ==
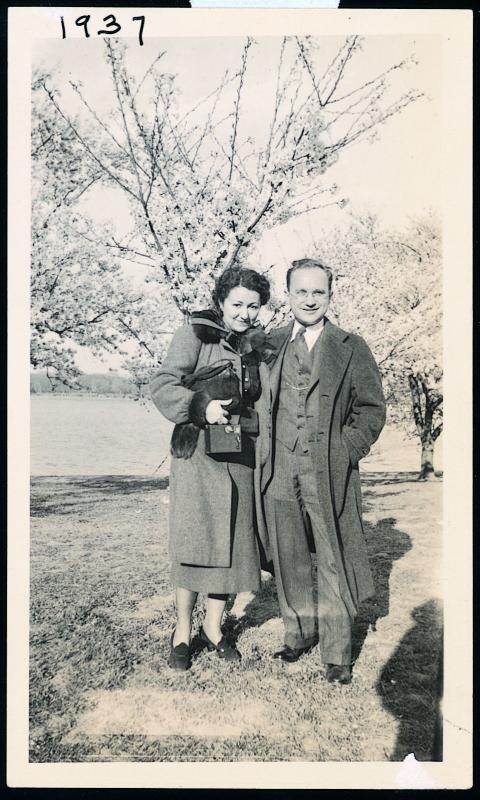
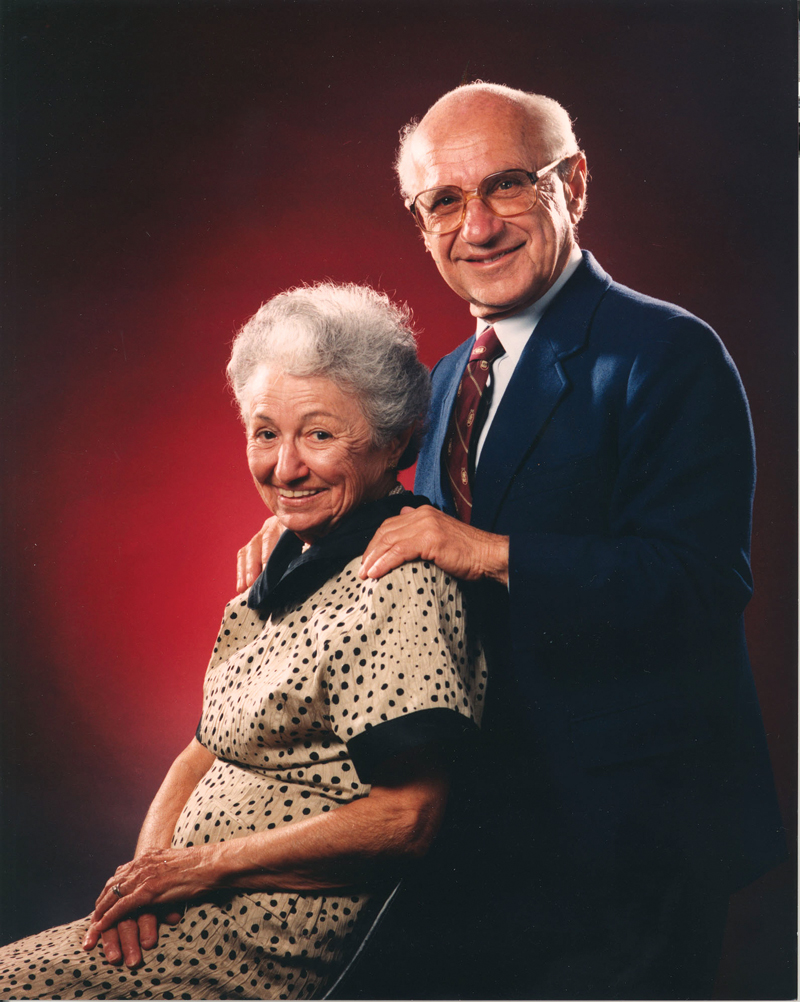
Milton and Rose Friedman

Friedman had two children, David and Jan. He met his wife, Rose Friedman (née Director), at the University of Chicago in 1932, and wed six years later, in 1938.

Friedman was noticeably shorter than some of his colleagues; he measured 5 feet 0 inches (1.52 m), and has been described as an "Elfin Libertarian" by Binyamin Appelbaum.

Rose Friedman, when asked about Friedman's successes, said that "I have never had the desire to compete with Milton professionally (perhaps because I was smart enough to recognize I couldn't). On the other hand, he has always made me feel that his achievement is my achievement."

During the 1960s, Friedman built (and subsequently maintained) a cottage in Fairlee, Vermont. Friedman also had an apartment in Russian Hill, San Francisco, where he lived from 1977 until his death.

=== Religious views ===
External videos
- Presentation by Milton and Rose Friedman on Two Lucky People: Memoirs, August 14, 1998, C-SPAN

According to a 2007 article in Commentary magazine, his "parents were moderately observant Jews, but Friedman, after an intense burst of childhood piety, rejected religion altogether". He described himself as an agnostic. Friedman wrote extensively of his life and experiences, especially in 1998 in his memoirs with his wife, Rose, titled Two Lucky People. In this book, Rose Friedman describes how she and Milton Friedman raised their two children, Janet and David, with a Christmas tree in the home. "Orthodox Jews of course, do not celebrate Christmas. However, just as, when I was a child, my mother had permitted me to have a Christmas tree one year when my friend had one, she not only tolerated our having a Christmas tree, she even strung popcorn to hang on it."

=== Death ===
Friedman died of heart failure at the age of 94 years in San Francisco on November 16, 2006. He was still a working economist performing original economic research; his last column was published in The Wall Street Journal the day after his death. He was survived by his wife, Rose Friedman (who would die on August 18, 2009), and their two children, David D. Friedman, known for The Machinery of Freedom, as well as his unique anarcho-capitalism from a Chicago School perspective, and attorney and bridge player Jan Martel.

== Scholarly contributions ==
=== Economics ===
Friedman was best known for reviving interest in the money supply as a determinant of the nominal value of output, that is, the quantity theory of money. Monetarism is the set of views associated with modern quantity theory. Its origins can be traced back to the 16th-century School of Salamanca or even further; however, Friedman's contribution is largely responsible for its modern popularization. He co-authored, with Anna Schwartz, A Monetary History of the United States, 1867–1960 (1963), which was an examination of the role of the money supply and economic activity in the U.S. history.

Friedman was the main proponent of the monetarist school of economics. He maintained that there is a close and stable association between inflation and the money supply, mainly that inflation could be avoided with proper regulation of the monetary base's growth rate. He famously used the analogy of "dropping money out of a helicopter", to avoid dealing with money injection mechanisms and other factors that would overcomplicate his models.

Friedman's arguments were designed to counter the popular concept of cost-push inflation, that the increased general price level at the time was the result of increases in the price of oil, or increases in wages; as he wrote:

Inflation is always and everywhere a monetary phenomenon.

— Milton Friedman, 1963

Friedman rejected the use of fiscal policy as a tool of demand management; he also held the belief that the government's role in the guidance of the economy should be restricted severely. Friedman wrote extensively on the Great Depression, and he termed the 1929–1933 period the Great Contraction. He argued that the Depression had been caused by an ordinary financial shock and the duration and seriousness of which were greatly increased by the subsequent contraction of the money supply caused by the misguided policies of the directors of the Federal Reserve.

The Fed was largely responsible for converting what might have been a garden-variety recession, although perhaps a fairly severe one, into a major catastrophe. Instead of using its powers to offset the depression, it presided over a decline in the quantity of money by one-third from 1929 to 1933 ... Far from the depression being a failure of the free-enterprise system, it was a tragic failure of government.

— Milton Friedman, Two Lucky People

This theory was put forth in A Monetary History of the United States, and the chapter on the Great Depression was then published as a stand-alone book entitled The Great Contraction, 1929–1933. Both books are still in print from the Princeton University Press, and some editions include as an appendix a speech at a University of Chicago event honoring Friedman in which Ben Bernanke made this statement:

Let me end my talk by abusing slightly my status as an official representative of the Federal Reserve. I would like to say to Milton and Anna: Regarding the Great Depression, you're right. We did it. We're very sorry. But thanks to you, we won't do it again.

Friedman also argued for the removal of government intervention in currency markets, thereby spawning an enormous literature on the subject, as well as promoting the practice of freely floating exchange rates. His close friend George Stigler explained, "As is customary in science, he did not win a full victory, in part because research was directed along different lines by the theory of rational expectations, a newer approach developed by Robert Lucas, also at the University of Chicago." The relationship between Friedman and Lucas, or new classical macroeconomics as a whole, was highly complex. The Friedmanian Phillips curve was an interesting starting point for Lucas, but he soon realized that the solution provided by Friedman was not quite satisfactory. Lucas elaborated a new approach in which rational expectations were presumed instead of the Friedmanian adaptive expectations. Due to this reformulation, the story in which the theory of the new classical Phillips curve was embedded radically changed. This modification, however, had a significant effect on Friedman's own approach, so, as a result, the theory of the Friedmanian Phillips curve also changed. Moreover, new classical adherent Neil Wallace, who was a graduate student at the University of Chicago between 1960 and 1963, regarded Friedman's theoretical courses as a mess, highlighting the strained relationship between monetarism and new classical schools.

Friedman was also known for his work on the consumption function, the permanent income hypothesis (1957), which Friedman himself referred to as his best scientific work. This work contended that utility-maximizing consumers would spend a proportional amount of what they perceived to be their permanent income. Windfall gains would mostly be saved because of the law of diminishing marginal utility.

Friedman's essay "The Methodology of Positive Economics" (1953) provided the epistemological pattern for his own subsequent research and to a degree that of the Chicago School. There he argued that economics as science should be free of value judgments for it to be objective. Moreover, a useful economic theory should be judged not by its descriptive realism but by its simplicity and fruitfulness as an engine of prediction. That is, students should measure the accuracy of its predictions, rather than the 'soundness of its assumptions'. His argument was part of an ongoing debate among such statisticians as Jerzy Neyman, Leonard Savage, and Ronald Fisher.

While being an advocate of the free market, Friedman believed that the government had two crucial roles. In an interview with Phil Donahue, Friedman argued that "the two basic functions of a government are to protect the nation against foreign enemy, and to protect citizens against its fellows". He also admitted that although privatization of national defense could reduce the overall cost, he has not yet thought of a way to make this privatization possible.

=== Rejection and subsequent evolution of the Phillips curve ===
Long-run Phillips curve (NAIRU)

Other important contributions include his critique of the Phillips curve and the concept of the natural rate of unemployment (1968). This critique associated his name, together with that of Edmund Phelps, with the insight that a government that brings about greater inflation cannot permanently reduce unemployment by doing so. Unemployment may be temporarily lower, if the inflation is a surprise, but in the long run unemployment will be determined by the frictions and imperfections of the labor market. If the conditions are not met and inflation is expected, the "long run" effects will replace the "short term" effects.

Through his critique, the Phillips curve evolved from a strict model emphasizing the connection between inflation and unemployment as being absolute, to a model which emphasized short term unemployment reductions and long term employment stagnations.

Friedman's revised and updated Phillips Curve also changed as a result of Robert Lucas's idea of Rational expectations, replacing the adaptive expectations Friedman used.

=== Statistics ===
One of his most famous contributions to statistics is sequential sampling. Friedman did statistical work at the Division of War Research at Columbia, where he and his colleagues came up with the technique. It became, in the words of The New Palgrave Dictionary of Economics, "the standard analysis of quality control inspection". The dictionary adds, "Like many of Friedman's contributions, in retrospect it seems remarkably simple and obvious to apply basic economic ideas to quality control; that, however, is a measure of his genius."

=== Corporate social responsibility ===
Friedman criticised corporate social responsibility, most famously in an op-ed in The New York Times Magazine in 1970. Friedman argued that businesses often used claims about social responsibility to increase returns and described them as "hypocritical window dressing". Managers were also poorly prepared to make decisions about social causes and these outlays diverted funds that belonged instead to shareholders. Friedman believed that only monopolistic corporations could routinely make altruistic expenditures on social responsibility, because in a competitive market such costs would undermine the business.

== Public policy positions ==
=== Federal Reserve and monetary policy ===
Although Friedman concluded the government does have a role in the monetary system he was critical of the Federal Reserve due to its poor performance and felt it should be abolished. He was opposed to Federal Reserve policies, even during the so-called "Volcker shock" that was labeled "monetarist". Friedman believed the Federal Reserve System should ultimately be replaced with a computer program. He favored a system that would automatically buy and sell securities in response to changes in the money supply.

The proposal to constantly grow the money supply at a certain predetermined amount every year has become known as Friedman's k-percent rule. There is debate about the effectiveness of a theoretical money supply targeting regime. The Fed's inability to meet its money supply targets from 1978 to 1982 led some to conclude it is not a feasible alternative to more conventional inflation and interest rate targeting. Towards the end of his life, Friedman expressed doubt about the validity of targeting the quantity of money. To date, most countries have adopted inflation targeting instead of the k-percent rule.

Idealistically, Friedman actually favored the principles of the 1930s Chicago plan, which would have ended fractional reserve banking and, thus, private money creation. It would force banks to have 100% reserves backing deposits, and instead place money creation powers solely in the hands of the US Government. This would make targeting money growth more possible, as endogenous money created by fractional reserve lending would no longer be a major issue.

Friedman was a strong advocate for floating exchange rates throughout the entire Bretton-Woods period (1944–1971). He argued that a flexible exchange rate would make external adjustment possible and allow countries to avoid balance of payments crises. He saw fixed exchange rates as an undesirable form of government intervention. The case was articulated in an influential 1953 paper, "The Case for Flexible Exchange Rates", at a time when most commentators regarded the possibility of floating exchange rates as an unrealistic policy proposal.

=== Foreign policy ===
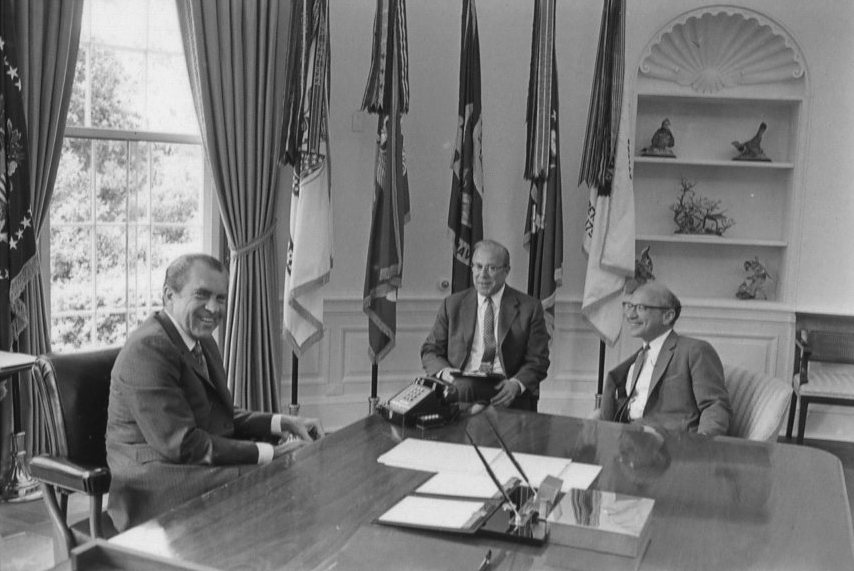
Friedman with Richard Nixon and George Shultz in 1971

While Walter Oi is credited with establishing the economic basis for a volunteer military, Friedman was a proponent, and was credited with ending the draft, stating that the draft was "inconsistent with a free society".

In Capitalism and Freedom, he argued conscription is inequitable and arbitrary, preventing young men from shaping their lives as they see fit. During the Nixon administration he headed the committee to research a conversion to paid/volunteer armed force. Friedman did, however, believe the introduction of a system of universal military training as a reserve in cases of war-time could be justified. He still opposed its implementation in the United States, describing it as a "monstrosity".

Biographer Lanny Ebenstein noted a drift over time in Friedman's views from an interventionist to a more cautious foreign policy. He supported US involvement in the Second World War and initially supported a hard-line against Communism, but moderated over time. However, Friedman did state in a 1995 interview that he was an anti-interventionist. He opposed the Gulf War and the Iraq War. In a spring 2006 interview, Friedman said the US's stature in the world had been eroded by the Iraq War, but that it might be improved if Iraq were to become a peaceful and independent country.

=== Libertarianism and the Republican Party ===
Friedman was an economic advisor and speech writer in Barry Goldwater's failed presidential campaign in 1964. In 1968, Friedman served on a committee of economic advisers to Richard Nixon's presidential campaign. He was an advisor to California governor Ronald Reagan and was active in Reagan's presidential campaigns. He served as a member of President Reagan's Economic Policy Advisory Board starting in 1981. In 1988, he received the Presidential Medal of Freedom and the National Medal of Science.

In a 1995 interview with Reason magazine, Friedman criticized Murray Rothbard and Ayn Rand as "cult builders" and "dogmatists", citing this as justification for not joining the U.S. Libertarian Party. Friedman stated that he was a member of the Republican Party, "not because they have any principles, but because that's the way I am the most useful and have most influence." He described his philosophy as "clearly libertarian", though distanced himself from "zero-government" libertarianism, which he called "infeasible", citing the lack of historical examples of that philosophy succeeding. Friedman attended the libertarian Future of Freedom Conference in 1990.

His citation for the Presidential Medal of Freedom reads: "He has used a brilliant mind to advance a moral vision: the vision of a society where men and women are free, free to choose, but where government is not as free to override their decisions. That vision has changed America, and it is changing the world. All of us owe a tremendous debt to this man's towering intellect and his devotion to liberty."

=== Governmental involvement in the economy ===
In a 1962 essay that builds on arguments made by A. V. Dicey, Friedman argued that a "free society" would constitute a desirable but unstable equilibrium, due to an asymmetry between the visible benefits and the hidden harms of government intervention; he uses tariffs as an example of a policy that brings noticeable financial benefits to a visible group, but causes worse harms to a diffuse group of workers and consumers.

Friedman was supportive of the state provision of some public goods that private businesses are not considered as being able to provide. However, he argued that many of the services performed by government could be performed better by the private sector. Above all, if some public goods are provided by the state, he believed that they should not be a legal monopoly where private competition is prohibited; for example, he wrote:

There is no way to justify our present public monopoly of the post office. It may be argued that the carrying of mail is a technical monopoly and that a government monopoly is the least of evils. Along these lines, one could perhaps justify a government post office, but not the present law, which makes it illegal for anybody else to carry the mail. If the delivery of mail is a technical monopoly, no one else will be able to succeed in competition with the government. If it is not, there is no reason why the government should be engaged in it. The only way to find out is to leave other people free to enter.

— Milton Friedman,

In 1962, Friedman criticized Social Security in his book Capitalism and Freedom, arguing that it had created welfare dependency. However, in the penultimate chapter of the same book, Friedman argued that while capitalism had greatly reduced the extent of poverty in absolute terms, "poverty is in part a relative matter, [and] even in [wealthy Western] countries, there are clearly many people living under conditions that the rest of us label as poverty." Friedman also noted that while private charity could be one recourse for alleviating poverty and cited late 19th century Britain and the United States as exemplary periods of extensive private charity and eleemosynary activity, he made the following point:

It can be argued that private charity is insufficient because the benefits from it accrue to people other than those who make the gifts – ... a neighborhood effect. I am distressed by the sight of poverty; I am benefited by its alleviation; but I am benefited equally whether I or someone else pays for its alleviation; the benefits of other people's charity therefore partly accrue to me. To put it differently, we might all of us be willing to contribute to the relief of poverty, provided everyone else did. We might not be willing to contribute the same amount without such assurance. In small communities, public pressure can suffice to realize the proviso even with private charity. In the large impersonal communities that are increasingly coming to dominate our society, it is much more difficult for it to do so. Suppose one accepts, as I do, this line of reasoning as justifying governmental action to alleviate poverty; to set, as it were, a floor under the standard of life of every person in the community. [While there are questions of how much should be spent and how, the] arrangement that recommends itself on purely mechanical grounds is a negative income tax. ... The advantages of this arrangement are clear. It is directed specifically at the problem of poverty. It gives help in the form most useful to the individual, namely, cash. It is general and could be substituted for the host of special measures now in effect. It makes explicit the cost borne by society. It operates outside the market. Like any other measures to alleviate poverty, it reduces the incentives of those helped to help themselves, but it does not eliminate that incentive entirely, as a system of supplementing incomes up to some fixed minimum would. An extra dollar earned always means more money available for expenditure.

Friedman argued further that other advantages of the negative income tax were that it could fit directly into the tax system, would be less costly, and would reduce the administrative burden of implementing a social safety net. Friedman reiterated these arguments 18 years later in Free to Choose, with the additional proviso that such a reform would only be satisfactory if it replaced the current system of welfare programs rather than augment it. According to economist Robert H. Frank, writing in The New York Times, Friedman's views in this regard were grounded in a belief that while "market forces ... accomplish wonderful things", they "cannot ensure a distribution of income that enables all citizens to meet basic economic needs". Friedman also criticized urban renewal programs in the United States due to their racially discriminatory and economically regressive effects.

In 1979, Friedman expressed support for environmental taxes in general in an interview on The Phil Donahue Show, saying "the best way to [deal with pollution] is to impose a tax on the cost of the pollutants emitted by a car and make an incentive for car manufacturers and for consumers to keep down the amount of pollution." In Free to Choose, Friedman reiterated his support for environmental taxes as compared with increased environmental regulation, stating "The preservation of the environment and the avoidance of undue pollution are real problems and they are problems concerning which the government has an important role to play. ... Most economists agree that a far better way to control pollution than the present method of specific regulation and supervision is to introduce market discipline by imposing effluent charges."

In his 1955 article "The Role of Government in Education", Friedman proposed supplementing publicly operated schools with privately run but publicly funded schools through a system of school vouchers. Reforms similar to those proposed in the article were implemented in, for example, Chile in 1981 and Sweden in 1992. In 1996, Friedman, together with his wife, founded the Friedman Foundation for Educational Choice to advocate school choice and vouchers. In 2016, the Friedman Foundation changed its name to EdChoice to honor the Friedmans' desire to have the educational choice movement live on without their names attached to it after their deaths.

Michael Walker of the Fraser Institute and Friedman hosted a series of conferences from 1986 to 1994. The goal was to create a clear definition of economic freedom and a method for measuring it. Eventually this resulted in the first report on worldwide economic freedom, Economic Freedom in the World. This annual report has since provided data for numerous peer-reviewed studies and has influenced policy in several nations.

With sixteen other distinguished economists he opposed the Copyright Term Extension Act, and signed on to an amicus brief filed in Eldred v. Ashcroft.

Friedman argued for stronger basic legal (constitutional) protection of economic rights and freedoms to further promote industrial-commercial growth and prosperity and buttress democracy and freedom and the rule of law generally in society.

Friedman suggested medical savings accounts, repealing tax exemptions of employer-provided medical care and income-based deductibles as ways to lower health care costs in America. Friedman also argued that federal involvement in health care should be restricted, with state and local governments financing health care for the poor.

Friedman believed the government should not operate national parks. He argued that Yellowstone National Park should be sold for private development.

=== Social issues ===
Friedman also supported libertarian policies such as legalization of drugs and prostitution. During 2005, Friedman and more than 500 other economists advocated discussions regarding the economic benefits of the legalization of marijuana. He compared prohibition of recreational drugs to the historical prohibition of alcohol in the United States, and to a hypothetical ban on overeating food. Friedman stated that drug prohibition was not primarily an economic issue, but that "if you look at the drug war from a purely economic point of view, the role of the government is to protect the drug cartel."

Friedman was also a supporter of gay rights. He never specifically supported same-sex marriage, instead saying "I do not believe there should be any discrimination against gays."

Friedman favored immigration, saying "legal and illegal immigration has a very positive impact on the U.S. economy". However, he suggested that immigrants ought not to have access to the welfare system. Friedman stated that immigration from Mexico had been a "good thing", in particular illegal immigration. Friedman argued that illegal immigration was a boon because they "take jobs that most residents of this country are unwilling to take, they provide employers with workers of a kind they cannot get" and they do not use welfare. In Free to Choose, Friedman wrote:

No arbitrary obstacles should prevent people from achieving those positions for which their talents fit them and which their values lead them to seek. Not birth, nationality, color, religion, sex, nor any other irrelevant characteristic should determine the opportunities that are open to a person – only his abilities.

Friedman also famously argued that the welfare state must end before immigration, or more specifically, before open borders, because immigrants might have an incentive to come directly because of welfare payments. Economist Bryan Caplan has disputed this assertion, arguing that welfare is generally distributed not among immigrants, but instead retirees, through Social Security.

Friedman opposed public housing, as he believed it was a form of welfare. He believed that one of the main arguments politicians make for public housing is that regular low-income housing was too expensive due to the higher costs imposed by fire and police departments. He believed that it would only increase taxes and would not benefit low-income people in the long run. Friedman advocated direct cash transfers instead of public housing, believing that people would be better off that way. He argued that liberals would never agree with this idea because they do not trust their own citizens. He also stated that regression has already happened with more land being left vacant due to slow construction. Friedman argued that public housing instead encourages juvenile delinquency.

Friedman was also against minimum wage laws; he saw them as a clear case as one can find that the precise opposite is happening when this was attempted. Minimum wage laws would increase unemployment in his eyes and that employers would not hire back workers that were already there for less pay. In his view, this would leave low-income people worse off because the voters for minimum wage laws would then become the victims of unemployment. He believed that these ideas of new minimum wage laws came from Northern factories and Unions, in an attempt to reduce competition from the South.

== Honors, recognition and legacy ==
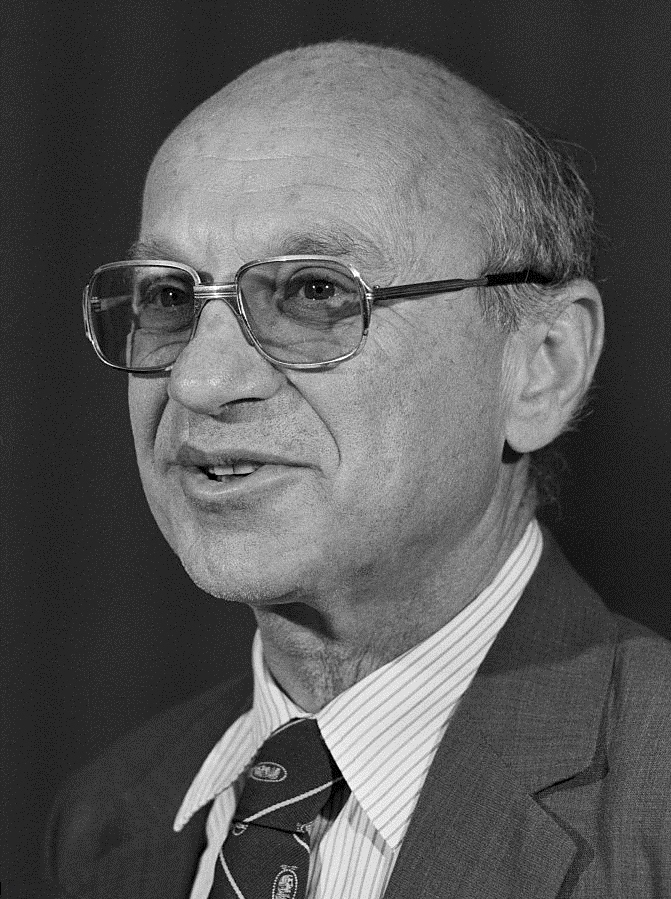
Friedman in 1976

George H. Nash, a leading historian of American conservatism, says that by "the end of the 1960s he was probably the most highly regarded and influential conservative scholar in the country, and one of the few with an international reputation". In 1971, Friedman received the Golden Plate Award of the American Academy of Achievement. Friedman allowed the libertarian Cato Institute to use his name for its biennial Milton Friedman Prize for Advancing Liberty beginning in 2001. A Friedman Prize was given to the late British economist Peter Bauer in 2002, Peruvian economist Hernando de Soto in 2004, Mart Laar, former Estonian Prime Minister in 2006 and a young Venezuelan student Yon Goicoechea in 2008. His wife Rose, sister of Aaron Director, with whom he initiated the Friedman Foundation for Educational Choice, served on the international selection committee.

Upon Friedman's death, Harvard President Lawrence Summers called him "The Great Liberator", saying "any honest Democrat will admit that we are now all Friedmanites." He said Friedman's great popular contribution was "in convincing people of the importance of allowing free markets to operate".

Stephen Moore, a member of the editorial board of The Wall Street Journal, said in 2013: "Quoting the most-revered champion of free-market economics since Adam Smith has become a little like quoting the Bible." He adds, "There are sometimes multiple and conflicting interpretations."

Although post-Keynesian economist J. K. Galbraith was a prominent critic of Friedman and his ideology, he observed that "The age of John Maynard Keynes gave way to the age of Milton Friedman."

=== 1976 Nobel Memorial Prize in Economic Sciences ===
Friedman was awarded the Nobel Memorial Prize in Economic Sciences, the sole recipient for 1976, "for his achievements in the fields of consumption analysis, monetary history and theory and for his demonstration of the complexity of stabilization policy". His appointment was controversial, mainly for his association with military dictator Augusto Pinochet. Some economists, such as Institutional economist and 1974 Nobel Prize winner Gunnar Myrdal, criticized Friedman, and Myrdal's own 1974 Nobel Prize partner Friedrich Hayek, for being reactionaries. Myrdal's criticism caused some economists to oppose the Sveriges Riksbank Prize in Economics Sciences in Memory of Alfred Nobel itself.

=== Hong Kong ===
Friedman said, "If you want to see capitalism in action, go to Hong Kong." He wrote in 1990 that the Hong Kong economy was perhaps the best example of a free market economy.

One month before his death, he wrote "Hong Kong Wrong – What would Cowperthwaite say?" in The Wall Street Journal, criticizing Donald Tsang, Chief Executive of Hong Kong, for abandoning "positive non interventionism". Tsang later said he was merely changing the slogan to "big market, small government", where small government is defined as less than 20% of GDP. In a debate between Tsang and his rival Alan Leong before the 2007 Hong Kong Chief Executive election, Leong introduced the topic and jokingly accused Tsang of angering Friedman to death (Friedman had died only a year prior).

=== Chile ===
During 1975, two years after the military coup that brought military dictator Augusto Pinochet to power and ended the government of Salvador Allende, the economy of Chile experienced a severe crisis. Friedman and Arnold Harberger accepted an invitation of a private Chilean foundation to visit Chile and speak on principles of economic freedom. He spent seven days in Chile giving a series of lectures at the Pontifical Catholic University of Chile and the University of Chile. One of the lectures was entitled "The Fragility of Freedom" and according to Friedman, "dealt with precisely the threat to freedom from a centralized military government."

In a letter to Pinochet of April 21, 1975, Friedman considered the "key economic problems of Chile are clearly ... inflation and the promotion of a healthy social market economy". He stated that "There is only one way to end inflation: by drastically reducing the rate of increase of the quantity of money" and that "cutting government spending is by far and away the most desirable way to reduce the fiscal deficit, because it ... strengthens the private sector thereby laying the foundations for healthy economic growth". As to how rapidly inflation should be ended, Friedman felt that "for Chile where inflation is raging at 10–20% a month ... gradualism is not feasible. It would involve so painful an operation over so long a period that the patient would not survive." Choosing "a brief period of higher unemployment" was the lesser evil.. and that "the experience of Germany, ... of Brazil ..., of the post-war adjustment in the U.S. ... all argue for shock treatment". In the letter Friedman recommended to deliver the shock approach with "a package to eliminate the surprise and to relieve acute distress" and "for definiteness let me sketch the contents of a package proposal ... to be taken as illustrative" although his knowledge of Chile was "too limited to enable [him] to be precise or comprehensive". He listed a "sample proposal" of 8 monetary and fiscal measures including "the removal of as many as obstacles as possible that now hinder the private market. For example, suspend ... the present law against discharging employees". He closed, stating "Such a shock program could end inflation in months". His letter suggested that cutting spending to reduce the fiscal deficit would result in less transitional unemployment than raising taxes.

Sergio de Castro, a Chilean Chicago School graduate, became the nation's Minister of Finance in 1975. During his six-year tenure, foreign investment increased, restrictions were placed on striking and labor unions, and GDP rose yearly. A foreign exchange program was created between the Catholic University of Chile and the University of Chicago. Many other Chicago School alumni were appointed government posts during and after Pinochet's dictatorship; others taught its economic doctrine at Chilean universities. They became known as the Chicago Boys.

Friedman defended his activity in Chile on the grounds that, in his opinion, the adoption of free market policies not only improved the economic situation of Chile but also contributed to the amelioration of Pinochet's rule and to the eventual transition to a democratic government during 1990. That idea is included in Capitalism and Freedom, in which he declared that economic freedom is not only desirable in itself but is also a necessary condition for political freedom. In his 1980 documentary Free to Choose, he said the following: "Chile is not a politically free system, and I do not condone the system. But the people there are freer than the people in Communist societies because government plays a smaller role. ... The conditions of the people in the past few years has been getting better and not worse. They would be still better to get rid of the junta and to be able to have a free democratic system." In 1984, Friedman stated that he has "never refrained from criticizing the political system in Chile". In 1991, he said: "I have nothing good to say about the political regime that Pinochet imposed. It was a terrible political regime. The real miracle of Chile is not how well it has done economically; the real miracle of Chile is that a military junta was willing to go against its principles and support a free market regime designed by principled believers in a free market. ... In Chile, the drive for political freedom, that was generated by economic freedom and the resulting economic success, ultimately resulted in a referendum that introduced political democracy. Now, at long last, Chile has all three things: political freedom, human freedom and economic freedom. Chile will continue to be an interesting experiment to watch to see whether it can keep all three or whether, now that it has political freedom, that political freedom will tend to be used to destroy or reduce economic freedom." He stressed that the lectures he gave in Chile were the same lectures he later gave in China and other socialist states. He further stated "I do not consider it as evil for an economist to render technical economic advice to the Chilean Government, any more than I would regard it as evil for a physician to give technical medical advice to the Chilean Government to help end a medical plague."

During the 2000 PBS documentary The Commanding Heights (based on the book), Friedman continued to argue that "free markets would undermine [Pinochet's] political centralization and political control", and that criticism over his role in Chile missed his main contention that freer markets resulted in freer people, and that Chile's unfree economy had caused Pinochet's rise. Friedman advocated for free markets which undermined "political centralization and political control".

Because of his involvement with the government of Chile, which was a dictatorship at the time of his visit, there were international protests, spanning from Sweden to America when Friedman was awarded the Nobel Memorial Prize in 1976. Friedman was accused of supporting the military dictatorship in Chile because of the relation of economists of the University of Chicago to Pinochet, and a seven-day trip he took to Chile during March 1975 (less than two years after the coup that ended with the death of President Salvador Allende). Friedman answered that he was never an advisor to the dictatorship, but only gave some lectures and seminars on inflation, and met with officials, including Augusto Pinochet the head of the military dictatorship, while in Chile.

After a 1991 speech on drug legalization, Friedman answered a question on his involvement with the Pinochet regime. Friedman said that he was never an advisor to Pinochet (also mentioned in his 1984 Iceland interview), but that a group of University of Chicago students were involved in Chile's economic reforms. Friedman credited these reforms with high levels of economic growth and with the establishment of democracy that has subsequently occurred in Chile. In October 1988, after returning from a lecture tour of China during which he had met with Zhao Ziyang, General Secretary of the Chinese Communist Party, Friedman wrote to The Stanford Daily asking if he should anticipate a similar "avalanche of protests for having been willing to give advice to so evil a government? And if not, why not?"

=== Iceland ===
Friedman visited Iceland during the autumn of 1984, met with important Icelanders and gave a lecture at the University of Iceland on the "tyranny of the status quo". He participated in a lively television debate on August 31, 1984, with socialist intellectuals, including Ólafur Ragnar Grímsson, who later became President of Iceland. When they complained that a fee was charged for attending his lecture at the university and that, hitherto, lectures by visiting scholars had been free-of-charge, Friedman replied that previous lectures had not been free-of-charge in a meaningful sense: lectures always have related costs. What mattered was whether attendees or non-attendees covered those costs. Friedman thought that it was fairer that only those who attended paid. In this discussion Friedman also stated that he did not receive any money for delivering that lecture.

=== Estonia ===
Although Friedman never visited Estonia, his book Free to Choose influenced Estonia's then 32-year-old prime minister, Mart Laar, who has claimed that it was the only book on economics he had read before taking office. Laar's reforms are often credited with responsibility for transforming Estonia from an impoverished Soviet republic to the "Baltic Tiger". A prime element of Laar's program was introduction of the flat tax. Laar won the 2006 Milton Friedman Prize for Advancing Liberty, awarded by the Cato Institute.

=== United Kingdom ===
After 1950, Friedman was frequently invited to lecture in Britain; by the 1970s, his ideas had gained widespread attention in conservative circles. For example, he was a regular speaker at the Institute of Economic Affairs (IEA), a libertarian think tank. Conservative leader Margaret Thatcher closely followed IEA programs and ideas and met Friedman there in 1978, a year before she became Prime Minister. He also strongly influenced Keith Joseph, who initially became Thatcher's Secretary of State for Industry and later Secretary of State for Education and Science, as well as Alan Walters and Patrick Minford, two other key advisers. Major newspapers, including the Daily Telegraph, The Times, and The Financial Times all promulgated Friedman's monetarist ideas to British decision-makers. Friedman's ideas strongly influenced Thatcher and her allies when she became Prime Minister in 1979. Galbraith strongly criticised the "workability of the Friedmanite formula" for which, he said, "Britain has volunteered to be the guinea pig".

=== United States ===
After his death a number of obituaries and articles were written in Friedman's honor, citing him as one of the most important and influential economists of the post-war era. Milton Friedman's somewhat controversial legacy in America remains strong within the conservative movement. However, some journalists and economists like Noah Smith and Scott Sumner have argued Friedman's academic legacy has been buried under his political philosophy and misinterpreted by modern conservatives.

=== Criticism of published works ===
Friedman's exogenous money supply theory has been deeply criticized by British Post-Keynesian economist Nicholas Kaldor in the 1970s. While Friedman and monetarist economists claimed that the money supply was exogenously created by a powerful central bank, Kaldor claimed that the money was created by second-tier banks through the distribution of credits to households and companies. In the Post-Keynesian framework, central banks simply refinance second-tier banks on demand but are not in the core of monetary creation. Milton Friedman and Nicholas Kaldor were involved in a fierce debate in 1969–70, in which the monetarist economist had the upper hand. In 1982, Kaldor published a book entitled The Scourge of Monetarism, deeply criticizing monetarist-inspired policies.

Econometrician David Hendry criticized part of Friedman's and Anna Schwartz's 1982 Monetary Trends. When asked about it during an interview with Icelandic TV in 1984, Friedman said that the criticism referred to a different problem from that which he and Schwartz had tackled, and hence was irrelevant, and pointed out the lack of consequential peer review amongst econometricians on Hendry's work. In 2006, Hendry said that Friedman was guilty of "serious errors" of misunderstanding that meant "the t-ratios he reported for UK money demand were overstated by nearly 100 per cent", and said that, in a paper published in 1991 with Neil Ericsson, he had refuted "almost every empirical claim ... made about UK money demand" by Friedman and Schwartz. A 2004 paper updated and confirmed the validity of the Hendry–Ericsson findings through 2000. Some commentators believe that Friedman was not open enough, in their view, to the possibility of market inefficiencies. Economist Noah Smith argues that while Friedman made many important contributions to economic theory not all of his ideas relating to macroeconomics have entirely held up over the years and that too few people are willing to challenge them.

Political scientist C. B. Macpherson disagreed with Friedman's historical assessment of economic freedom leading to political freedom, suggesting that political freedom actually gave way to economic freedom for property-owning elites. He also challenged the notion that markets efficiently allocated resources and rejected Friedman's definition of liberty. Friedman's positivist methodological approach to economics has also been critiqued and debated. Finnish economist Uskali Mäki argued some of his assumptions were unrealistic and vague.

Friedman has been criticized by some prominent Austrian economists, including Murray Rothbard and Walter Block. Block called Friedman a "socialist" and was critical of his support for a central banking system, saying "First and foremost, this economist supported the Federal Reserve System all throughout his professional life. That organization of course does not own the money stock, but controls it. Friedman was an inveterate hater of the gold standard, denigrating its advocates as 'gold bugs'." Rothbard criticized Friedman's conclusion that the Great Depression happened as a result of a deflationary spiral, arguing that this is inconsistent with the data, even though during the period described by Friedman as "The Great Contraction", the money supply did in fact decrease year-over-year by over 10 percentage points.

Although A Monetary History of the United States is widely considered to be among the most influential economics books ever made, it has endured criticisms for its conclusion that the Federal Reserve was to blame for the Great Depression. Some economists, including noted Friedman critic Peter Temin, have raised questions about the legitimacy of Friedman's claims about whether or not monetary quantity levels were endogenous rather than exogenously determined, as A Monetary History of the United States posits. Nobel-prize winning economist Paul Krugman argued that the 2008 recession proved that, during a recession, a central bank cannot control broad money (M3 money, as defined by the OECD), and even if it can, the money supply does not bear a direct or proven relationship with GDP. According to Krugman, this was true in the 1930s, and the claim that the Federal Reserve could have avoided the Great Depression by reacting to what Friedman called The Great Contraction is "highly dubious".

James Tobin questioned the importance of velocity of money, and how informative this measure of the frequency of transactions is to the understanding of the various fluctuations observed in A Monetary History of the United States.

Economic historian Barry Eichengreen argued that because of the gold standard, which was at this point in time the chief monetary system of the world, the Federal Reserve's hands were tied. This was because, to retain the credibility of the gold standard, the Federal Reserve could not undertake actions like dramatically expanding the money supply as proposed by Friedman and Schwartz.

Lawrence Mishel, distinguished fellow of the Economic Policy Institute, argues that wages have been kept low in the United States because of the Friedman doctrine, namely the adoption of corporate practices and economic policies (or the blocking of reforms) at the behest of business and the wealthy elite, which resulted in the systematic disempowerment of workers. He argues that the lack of worker power caused wage suppression, increased wage inequality, and exacerbated racial disparities. Notably, mechanisms such as excessive unemployment, globalization, eroded labor standards (and their lack of enforcement), weakened collective bargaining, and corporate structure changes that disadvantage workers, all collectively functioned to keep wages low. From 1980 to 2020, while economy-wide productivity rose almost 70 percent, hourly compensation for typical workers increased less than 12 percent, while the earnings of the top 1 percent and 0.1 percent increased 158 percent and 341 percent, respectively.

== Selected bibliography ==
=== Books ===
- A Theory of the Consumption Function (1957) ISBN 1614278121.
- A Program for Monetary Stability (Fordham University Press, 1960) 110 pp. online version ISBN 0823203719
- Capitalism and Freedom (1962), highly influential series of essays that established Friedman's position on major issues of public policy (excerpts)
- A Monetary History of the United States, 1867–1960, with Anna J. Schwartz, 1963; part 3 reprinted as The Great Contraction
- "The Role of Monetary Policy", American Economic Review, Vol. 58, No. 1 (Mar. 1968), pp. 1–17 JSTOR presidential address to American Economics Association
- "Inflation and Unemployment: Nobel Lecture", 1977, Journal of Political Economy. Vol. 85, pp. 451–472. JSTOR 1830192
- Free to Choose: A Personal Statement, with Rose Friedman, (1980), highly influential restatement of policy views
- The Essence of Friedman, essays edited by Kurt R. Leube, (1987) (ISBN 0817986626)
- Two Lucky People: Memoirs (with Rose Friedman) ISBN 0226264149 (1998) excerpt and text search
- Milton Friedman on Economics: Selected Papers by Milton Friedman, edited by Gary S. Becker (2008)

=== Articles ===
- Friedman, Milton (1959). "The Demand for Money: Some Theoretical and Empirical Results". Journal of Political Economy. 67 (4): 327–51. doi:10.1086/258194.
- — (1968). "The Role of Monetary Policy" (PDF). American Economic Review. 58 (1): 1–17.
- — (1977). "Nobel Lecture: Inflation and Unemployment". Journal of Political Economy. 85 (3): 451–72. doi:10.1086/260579.
- — (1978). "The Limitations of Tax Limitation". Quadrant. 22 (8): 22–24.

== See also ==
- Causes of the Great Depression
- David D. Friedman
- History of economic thought
- List of economists
- List of Jewish Nobel laureates
- List of Presidential Medal of Freedom recipients
- Ludwig von Mises
- Monetary/fiscal debate
- Patri Friedman
- "We are all Keynesians now"

== Explanatory notes ==
Awards
Preceded by Leonid Vitaliyevich Kantorovich; Tjalling C. Koopmans	Laureate of the Nobel Memorial Prize in Economics; 1976	Succeeded by Bertil Ohlin; James E. Meade
