= Great Contraction =

Early years of the Great Depression

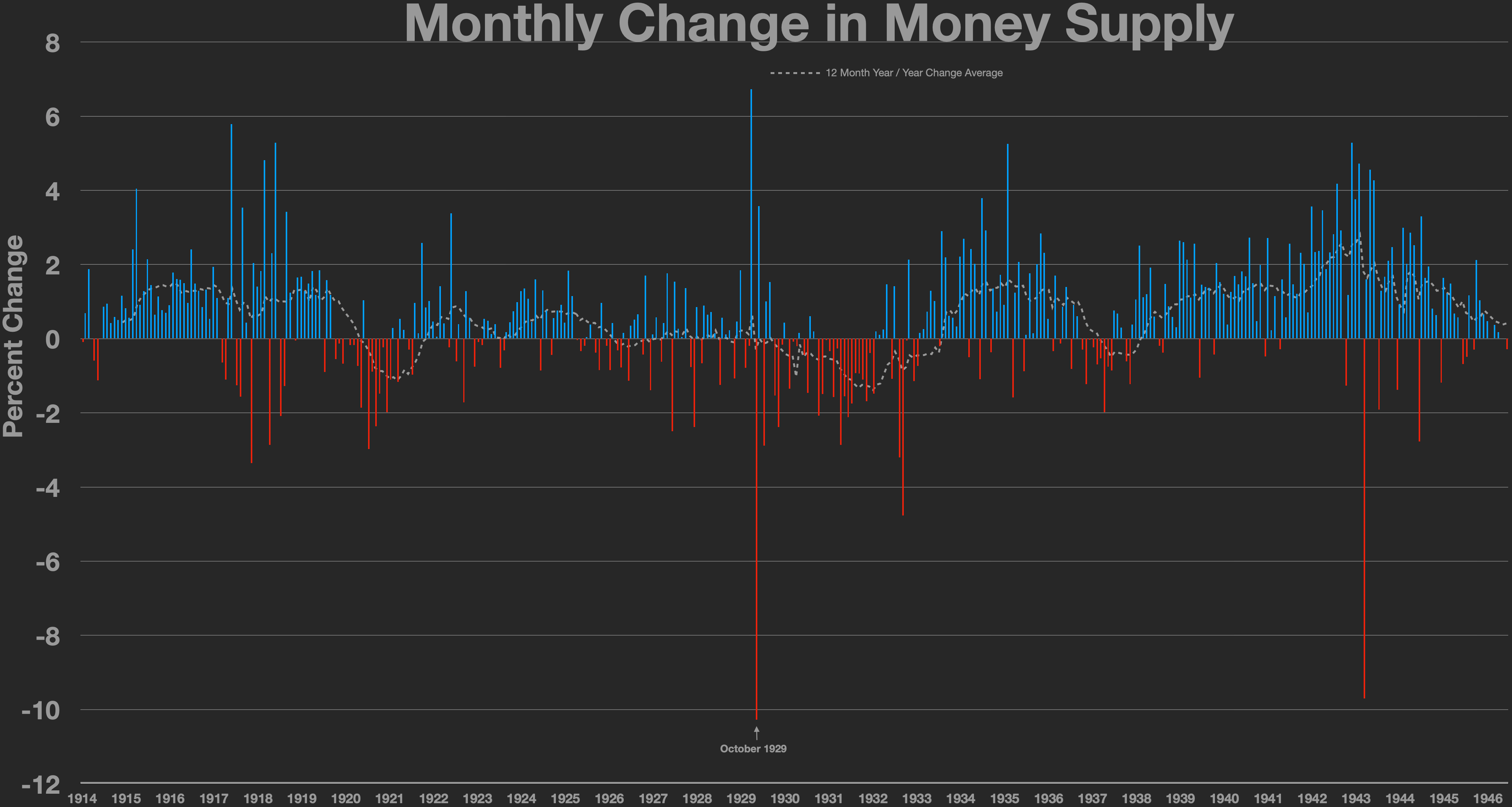
Total money supply contracted -10.28% in October 1929 and continued to contract for the next few years during Herbert Hoover's presidency

The Great Contraction, as characterized by economist Milton Friedman, was the recessionary period from 1929 until 1933, i.e., the early years of the Great Depression. The phrase was the title of a chapter in the 1963 book A Monetary History of the United States by Friedman and his fellow monetarist Anna Schwartz. The chapter was later published as a stand-alone book titled The Great Contraction, 1929–1933 in 1965. Both books are still in print from Princeton University Press, and some editions include as an appendix a speech honoring Friedman in which Federal Reserve Governor Ben Bernanke made this statement:

Let me end my talk by abusing slightly my status as an official representative of the Federal Reserve. I would like to say to Milton and Anna: Regarding the Great Depression, you're right. We did it. We're very sorry. But thanks to you, we won't do it again.
— Ben S. Bernanke

Friedman and Schwartz contended that the Great Depression was caused by the bank failures, which led to a monetary contraction of 35 percent, which they named “The Great Contraction”. The dramatic contraction of the monetary base then caused a 33 percent deflation in this period, which they argued transformed the crisis from a normal recession into a depression. Through this, they concluded that the Federal Reserve could have lessened the severity of the Great Depression by maintaining a constant flow of liquidity into monetary base, but failed to exercise its role of managing the monetary system and ameliorating banking panics under Fed chairmen Roy A. Young and Eugene Meyer.

The Great Contraction is not to be confused with the Great Compression, which refers to a period beginning around 1940 when (according to some economists such as Paul Krugman) economic inequality declined due to progressive taxation and other policies of the Franklin D. Roosevelt administration.

== See also ==
- Banking Act of 1933 and Banking Act of 1935
- Benjamin Strong Jr. — Federal Reserve Bank of New York president died while in office in October 1928
- Causes of the Great Depression
- Criticism of the Federal Reserve
