= Essays in Positive Economics =

1953 book by Milton Friedman

- First edition
- Author: Milton Friedman
- Language: English
- Genre: Non-fiction
- Publisher: University of Chicago Press
- Publication date: 1953

Milton Friedman's book Essays in Positive Economics (1953) is a collection of earlier articles by the author with as its lead an original essay "The Methodology of Positive Economics." This essay posits Friedman's famous, but controversial, principle (called the F-Twist by Samuelson) that assumptions need not be "realistic" to serve as scientific hypotheses; they merely need to make significant predictions.

== Contents of the book ==
The book is organized in four parts:

- Introduction

The Methodology of Positive Economics

- Price Theory

The Marshallian Demand Curve
The ‘Welfare’ Effects of an Income Tax and an Excise Tax

- Monetary Theory and Policy

The Effects of a Full-Employment Policy on Economic Stability: A Formal Analysis
A Monetary and Fiscal Framework for Economic Stability
The Case for Flexible Exchange Rates
Commodity-Reserve Currency
Discussion of the Inflationary Gap
Comments on Monetary Policy

- Comments on Method

Lange on Price Flexibility and Employment – A Methodological Criticism
Lerner on the Economics of Control

== The Methodology of Positive Economics ==
This first essay in the book explores John Neville Keynes's distinction between positive and normative economics, what is vs. what ought to be in economic matters. The essay sets out an epistemological program for Friedman's own research.

The essay argues that economics as science should be free of normative judgments for it to be respected as objective and to inform normative economics (for example whether to raise the minimum wage). Normative judgments frequently involve implicit predictions about the consequences of different policies. The essay suggests that such differences in principle could be narrowed by progress in positive economics (1953, p. 5).

The essay argues that a useful economic theory should not be judged primarily by its tautological completeness, however important in providing a consistent system for classifying elements of the theory and validly deriving implications therefrom. Rather a theory (or hypothesis) must be judged by its:

- simplicity in being able to predict at least as much as an alternate theory, although requiring less information
- fruitfulness in the precision and scope of its predictions and in its ability to generate additional research lines (p. 10).

In a famous and controversial passage, Friedman writes that:

Truly important and significant hypotheses will be found to have "assumptions" that are wildly inaccurate descriptive representations of reality, and, in general, the more significant the theory, the more unrealistic the assumptions (in this sense) (p. 14).

This is because such hypotheses and descriptions extract only those crucial elements sufficient to yield relatively precise, valid predictions, omitting a welter of predictively irrelevant details. Of course descriptive unrealism by itself does not ensure a "significant theory" (pp. 14–15).

From such Friedman rejects testing a theory by the realism of its assumptions. Rather simplicity and fruitfulness incline toward such assumptions and postulates as utility maximization, profit maximization, and ideal types—not merely to describe (which may be beside the point) but to predict economic behavior and to provide an engine of analysis (pp. 30–35). On profit maximization, for example, firms are posited to push each line of action to the point of equating the relevant marginal revenue and marginal cost. Yet, answers of businessmen to questions about the factors affecting their decisions may show no such calculation. Still, if firms act as if they are trying to maximize profits, that is the relevant test of the associated hypothesis (pp. 15, 22, 31).

== Place in economic methodology ==
Friedman is acknowledged as a pivotal figure in the Chicago school of economics. The essay can be read as a manifesto for that school. Still, Melvin Reder writes that a significant minority of Chicago-school economists such as Ronald Coase and James M. Buchanan have written as if "the validity of an economic theory lies in its intuitive appeal and/or its compatibility with a set of common-sense axioms rather than the conformity of its implications with empirical observation." Friedman's criterion of fruitfulness and usage of 'positive', however, seem to blur this point.

The essay's core claim and representation were by the late 1980s widely deployed in mainstream economics, even if methodological judgments, like other regulative judgments, are not purely positive. Its critics however, had by then long pointed out the flaw in Friedman's reasoning: by shielding assumptions from the requirement of realism, Friedman admits falsehoods as part of his theory. He defends against this by requiring only certain phenomena of interest to be explained, but as Samuelson pointed out, this can lead to unscientific cherry-picking of results. Samuelson dubbed Friedman's principle the F-Twist, avoiding naming it after Friedman directly out of courtesy.

Daniel M. Hausman described "The Methodology of Positive Economics" as "the most influential work on economic methodology of [the twentieth] century." He later noted that its influence was waning due to an empirical turn in economics that took place at the end the century, although by 2012 it still commonly served "as a way of avoiding awkward questions concerning simplifications, idealizations, and abstraction in economics rather than responding to them."

== Recepetion ==
In a 1954 review for Econometrica, economist Frank Hahn criticized the book.
