= Capitalism and Freedom =

1962 book by Milton Friedman

- Author: Milton Friedman
- Cover artist: Steven Cheung
- Language: English
- Genre: Non-fiction
- Publisher: University of Chicago Press
- Publication date: 1962
- Publication place: United States
- Media type: Print (hard & paperback)
- Pages: 202 (Fortieth anniversary edition)
- ISBN: 0-226-26421-1 (40th anniversary edition)
- OCLC: 49672469
- Dewey Decimal: 330.12/2 21
- LC Class: HB501 .F7 2002

Capitalism and Freedom is a book by Milton Friedman originally published in 1962 by the University of Chicago Press which discusses the role of economic capitalism in liberal society. It has sold more than half a million copies since 1962 and has been translated into eighteen languages.

Friedman argues for economic freedom as a precondition for political freedom. He defines "liberal" in European Enlightenment terms, contrasting with an American usage that he believes has been corrupted since the Great Depression.

The book identifies several places in which a free market can be promoted for both philosophical and practical reasons. Among other concepts, Friedman advocates ending the mandatory licensing of physicians and introducing a system of vouchers for school education.

== Context ==
Capitalism and Freedom was published nearly two decades after World War II, a time when the Great Depression was still in collective memory. Under the Kennedy and preceding Eisenhower administrations, federal expenditures were growing at a quick pace in the areas of national defense, social welfare, and infrastructure. Both major parties, Democratic and Republican, supported increased spending in different ways. This, as well as the New Deal, was supported by most intellectuals with the justification of Keynesian economics. Capitalism and Freedom introduces the idea of how competitive capitalism can help to achieve economic freedom.

The book drew inspiration from a series of lectures Friedman gave in June 1956 at Wabash College.

== Chapter summaries ==
Introduction

The introduction lays out the principles of Friedman's archetypal liberal, a man who supports limited and dispersed governmental power. Friedman opts for the continental European, rather than American, definition of the term.

i. The Relation between Economic Freedom and Political Freedom

In this chapter, Friedman promotes economic freedom as both a necessary freedom and also as a vital means for political freedom. He argues that, with the means for production under the auspices of the government, it is nearly impossible for real dissent and exchange of ideas to exist. Additionally, economic freedom is important, since any "bi-laterally voluntary and informed" transaction must benefit both parties to the transaction. Friedman states that economic freedom protects minorities from discrimination since the market is apathetic to "their views or color".

ii. The Role of Government in a Free Society

According to the author, the government of a liberal society should enforce law and order and property rights, as well as take action on certain technical monopolies and diminish negative "neighborhood effects". The government should also have control over money, as has long been recognized in the constitution and society.

iii. The Control of Money

He discusses the evolution of money in America, culminating in the Federal Reserve Act of 1913. Far from acting as a stabilizer, the Federal Reserve failed to act as it should have in several circumstances. Friedman proposes that the Federal Reserve have a consistent rule to increase the money supply by 3–5% annually.

iv. International Financial and Trade Arrangements

This chapter advocates the end of the Bretton Woods system in favor of a floating exchange rate system and the end of all currency controls and trade barriers, even "voluntary" export quotas. Friedman says that this is the only true solution to the balance of trade 'problem'.

v. Fiscal Policy

Friedman argues against the continual government spending justified to "balance the wheel" and help the economy to continue to grow. On the contrary, federal government expenditures make the economy less, not more stable. Friedman uses concrete evidence from his own research, demonstrating that the rise in government expenditures results in a roughly equal rise in GDP, contrasting with the Keynesian multiplier theory. Many reasons for this discrepancy are discussed.

vi. The Role of Government in Education

The policy advocated here are vouchers which students may use for education at a school of their choice. The author believes that everyone, in a democracy, needs a basic education for citizenship. Though there is underinvestment in human capital (in terms of spending at technical and professional schools), it would be foolish of the government to provide free technical education. The author suggests several solutions, some private, some public, to stop this underinvestment.

vii. Capitalism and Discrimination

In a capitalist society, Friedman argues, it costs money to discriminate, and it is very difficult, given the impersonal nature of market transactions. However, the government should not make selective employment practices laws (eventually embodied in the Civil Rights Act of 1964), as these inhibit the freedom to employ someone based on whatever qualifications the employer wishes to use.

viii. Monopoly and the Social Responsibility of Business and Labor

Friedman states, there are three alternatives for a monopoly: public monopoly, private monopoly, or public regulation. None of these is desirable or universally preferable. Monopolies come from many sources, but direct and indirect government intervention is the most common, and it should be stopped wherever possible. The doctrine of "social responsibility", that corporations should care about the community and not just profit, is highly subversive to the capitalist system and can only lead towards totalitarianism.

ix. Occupational Licensure

Friedman takes a radical stance against all forms of state licensure. The biggest advocates for licenses in an industry are, usually, the people in the industry, wishing to keep out potential competitors. The author defines registration, certification, and licensing, and, in the context of doctors, explains why the case for each one of these is weaker than the previous one. There is no liberal justification for licensing doctors; it results in inferior care and a medical cartel.

x. The Distribution of Income

Friedman examines the progressive income tax, introduced in order to redistribute income to make things more fair, and finds that, in fact, the rich take advantage of numerous loopholes, nullifying the redistributive effects. It would be far more fair just to have a uniform flat tax with no deductions, which could meet the 1962 tax revenues with a rate only slightly greater than the lowest tax bracket at that time.

xi. Social Welfare Measures

Though well-intentioned, many social welfare measures don't help the poor as much as some think. Friedman focuses on Social Security as a particularly large and unfair system.

xii. Alleviation of Poverty

Friedman regarded welfare programs as misguided and inefficient. To replace them, he advocates a negative income tax, giving everyone a guaranteed minimum income.

xiii. Conclusion

The conclusion to the book centers on how, time and time again, government intervention often has an effect opposite of that intended. Most good things in the United States and the world come from the free market, not the government, and they will continue to do so. The government, despite its good intentions, should stay out of areas where it does not need to be.

== Influence ==
The effects of Capitalism and Freedom were great yet varied in the realm of political economics. Some of Friedman's suggestions are being tested and implemented in many places, such as the flat income tax in Estonia (since 1994) and Slovakia (since 2004), a floating exchange rate which has almost fully replaced the Bretton Woods system, and national school voucher systems in Chile (since 1981) and Sweden (since 1992), to cite a few prominent examples. However, many other ideas have scarcely been considered, such as the end of licensing, and the abolition of corporate income tax (in favor of an income tax on the stock holder). Though politicians often claim that they are working towards "free trade", an idea the book supports, few American politicians have considered taking his suggestion of phasing out all tariffs in 10 years. Nevertheless, Friedman popularized many ideas previously unknown to most outside economics. This and other works helped Friedman to become a household name. The Times Literary Supplement called it "one of the most influential books published since the war".

Capitalism and Freedom, along with much of Friedman's writing, has influenced the movement of libertarian philosophy in America. Friedman's philosophy of economic and individual freedom has coincided with the emergence of political parties that have declared alignment with Friedman's ideas, such as the Libertarian Party.

Capitalism and Freedom made the Intercollegiate Studies Institute's 50 Best Books of the 20th Century and also was placed tenth on the list of the 100 best non-fiction books of the twentieth century compiled by National Review. In 2011, the book was placed on Time magazine's top 100 non-fiction books written in English since 1923.

== See also ==
- Bob Chitester
- The Machinery of Freedom
