= Agriculture and fisheries in the Bahamas =

The Bahamas is a net importer of food, importing almost 90% of its food supply. Of food imports, 80% are from the United States.

== Arable land and agriculture challenges ==
Only about 0.8% of the Bahamas' land area is arable, about 140 square km (54 square miles). Most arable land is on New Providence, Abaco, Andros, and Grand Bahama islands; challenges for Bahamian agriculture include limited fresh water resources for irrigation, the difficulties of inter-island transport of goods in the archipelago, a lack of human capital, the country's small size (which makes it vulnerable to economic shocks), and agrochemical contamination risks. Climate change is another key agricultural and fisheries challenge due to the negative effects of more intensive severe weather events and rising ocean temperatures; as a flat and small island developing state, the Bahamas is particularly vulnerable.

== History ==
Economist Virgil Henry Storr writes that "because of the country's poor soil, agriculture has never really been a viable enterprise in the Bahamas" and that Bahamian "settlers and citizens often found that in spite of their early successes with this or that crop, they were eventually unable to compete in foreign markets or with foreign producers in domestic markets on either quality or cost." For example, the Bahamas' soil is not well-suited for sugar cultivation. Storr argues that much of the Bahamas' economic history since 1492 has been influenced by illegal or extra-legal activities, such as piracy and privateering; wrecking; blockade-running during the American Civil War; rum-running to the United States during Prohibition era; and the modern-day drug trade.

=== 17th and 18th centuries ===
In the early years of the Bahamians' European settlement (in the 17th century, during the lords proprietors period), ambergris was significant economically; however, it was later supplanted by spermaceti oil. Whaling in Bahamian waters tended to be dominated by Bermudians, and a robust whaling industry did not emerge in the Bahamas, despite efforts from colonial administrators. By 1780–1800, the Bahamas' economy was principally based on cotton, salt, fruits, cattle, lumber and marine industries.

Unlike other islands of the West Indies (such as Jamaica, Trinidad, Barbados, Saint Lucia, Saint Vincent, and Guyana), the Bahamas never developed a large plantation system, principally because Bahamian soils were thin and scattered, and susceptible to soil exhaustion. Thus, the Bahamian economy developed along different lines from the other British West Indies; instead of producing valuable cash crops for Britain, the Bahamas' value for the colonial empire was chiefly military, and the Bahamas had a commercial, extractive, and subsistence economy. A far lower proportion of slaves in the colonial Bahamas worked as field hands as compared to other British colonies, such as sugar-dominated Jamaica and Barbados. Compared to the Bahamas, the mortality rate among enslaved laborers in Jamaica and Barbados was higher, and their food intake much lower. The slave trade was abolished by the Abolition of the Slave Trade Act 1807, and slaves in the British West Indies were emancipated in 1834.

Some American Loyalists, particularly from East Florida, fled to the Bahamas in 1784–1785, during the American Revolution, bringing their slaves with them. The Loyalists briefly fostered a plantation culture on the islands. A brief boom in cotton production in the southern Bahamas from 1785 to 1788 was followed by a collapse attributable to poor soil, hurricanes, and insect pests (specifically the chenille bug). In addition to the pests and poor soil, many loyalists were inexperienced as farmers. Cotton crop failures in the 1780s and 1790s led to a 99% decline over a decade, and a "moribund" plantation system. By the 1820s, most surviving plantations in the Bahamas had shifted from cotton to salt production and mixed agriculture, with some small-scale production of cotton continuing until the 1830s.

=== Pineapple industry ===
In the 19th century, the pineapple industry was by far the Bahamas' most significant crop; it began shortly after the abolition of slavery and peaked between 1885 and 1895; it thereafter precipitously declined. As the pineapple industry intensified, the most productive lands were consolidated into the hands of an "absentee merchant-landlord class" dominants by partnerships and limited companies, and the Bahamas had a monoculture in which pineapples were grown to the exclusion of other crops. This economic structure, along with the 18-month delay between the planting and harvesting of pineapples, and the risks of shipment and spoilage, put pressure on sharecroppers. The Bahamas pineapple industry declined for several reasons, including the American acquisition of Hawaii and the 1897 McKinley Tariff, soil exhaustion and plant disease on Abaco and northern Eleuthera, and overproduction. Pineapple canning factories operated in Nassau from 1876, and later expanded to Eleuthera; together, in 1900, they processed up to 75,000 cases of canned pineapples each season.

=== Sponge industry ===
The Bahamas once had a thriving natural sponge industry, which was the world's most productive. Exports began in 1841 from Great Bahamas Bank, and the industry subsequently grew, expanding to Little Bahamas Bank, shallows near Eleuthera, and Acklins Bight; Greek spongers from the Aegean arrived in the 1870s. Bahamas' sponge output was known for its quality, particularly the fine "velvet" and "wool" sponges.

At its peak from 1885 until in the first years of the 20th century, the Bahamas sponge industry exported more than 1.5 million sponges (competing with sponge industries in the Mediterranean and in Tampa, Tarpon Springs, and Key West in Florida) and employed a third of all male workers in the Bahamas. At the peak of the industry, between 3,000 and 6,000 men and boys were employed in the sponge industry, crewing hundreds of sloops and schooners and more than a thousand dinghies. Spongers, often black, labored under frequently harsh conditions marked by low wages and exploitation by outfitters and others. Greek migrants had more upward mobility and frequently took up positions as managers, auctioneers, wholesalers, and consignment agents.

The industry supplied additional employment in preparing the sponges (by clipping and packing), as well as in the boat-building and sail-making sectors.

The Bahamian sponge industry was later eclipsed by sponge extraction in Cuba, but had started to recover until it was devastated by a huge blight that hit in late 1938. In two months, 99% of Bahamian sponges were destroyed just as the Great Depression hit. The massive blight followed a series of hurricanes that damaged sponge stocks earlier in the 1930s. Climatic changes may have also played a role in the devastation of sponges in the region. By 1940, the industry had essentially collapsed, leading many in the sponge-diving centers of Andros, Abaco, and Acklins to suffer poverty. The sponge industry restarted in October 1946, but never completely recovered; the higher-quality sponges never returned, and the widespread availability of synthetic sponges reduced demand for natural sponges.

=== Sisal and hemp industry ===
The sisal (Agave sisalana) and hemp industries were prominent in the Bahamas from between 1890 and 1920. Sisal, an agave that was commercially useful as a hard fiber, reached the Bahamas from Mexico and the Florida Peninsula and Keys, and was apparently first introduced by the colonial secretary C.R. Nesbitt. Aided by the Colonial Office and the Kew Gardens in London, both hemp and sisal production was aggressively promoted by Sir Ambrose Shea during his tenure as governor of the Bahamas from 1887 to 1894.

Like the sponge industry, sisal cultivation was marked by exploitation, including worker debt to owners and frequent payment in tokens redeemable at company stores rather than cash. An "allotment" program introduced by Shea, intended to transfer Crown land to small farmers for sisal cultivation, did not result in any substantial number of sisal workers becoming freeholders. Conversely, some privileged corporate and individual investors received lands on highly generous terms, including Secretary of State for the Colonies Joseph Chamberlain, who managed a 20,000-acre estate on Andros. While sisal and hemp was initially profitable (largely because of disruptions caused by the Spanish–American War and high demand from the Boer War), the end of those conflicts made the industry unprofitable, and the Bahamian sisal industry is defunct.

=== Other ===
After the American Civil War, the Bahamas became a substantial tomato supplier to the U.S.; in 1879, the Bahamas shipped more than 8,000 boxes of tomatoes to the U.S.

== Present day ==
=== Role in economy, food security, and imports ===
Agriculture and fisheries make up a small portion of the economy of the Bahamas, which is dominated by tourism (80%) and financial services (15%); as of 2015, agriculture accounted for 0.7% of gross domestic product (GDP), and agriculture and fisheries combined accounted for 1.6% of GDP. Since the 1970s, many Haitians migrated to the Bahamas to do work as agriculture laborers and in other jobs; the Haitian migrants were often poor and subjected to discrimination and stigma in the Bahamas, and more than a thousand were deported after Hurricane Dorian in 2019.

In 1953, 10.55% and 3.05% of the entire Bahamian population was employed in agriculture and fisheries, respectively. As of 2018, agriculture makes up about 3% of employment, which is comparable to Barbados but lower than other Caribbean nations, such as Saint Vincent and the Grenadines and Jamaica.

A 2016 paper found that the Bahamas nationally "plausibly be categorized as experiencing transitory food insecurity" in part because of a high percentage of foods consumers are imported and in part because the country's agricultural sector has declined. The food supply varies significantly from island to island; in rural East Grand Bahama, about 60% of households with children and 69% of households without children were food-secure. The availability of farmers' markets, community-supported agriculture, and community gardens has been suggested as a measure that could positively affect Bahamian rural development and food security. In the 2020-21 budget, the government allocated $9 million to food security, although the president of the Bahamas Agro Entrepreneurs Group called for that amount to increase tenfold, and for the government to take steps aimed at reducing food import costs by 40%.

Repeated efforts by Bahamian government and industry to achieve a greater degree of food self-sufficiency or to boost the commercial agriculture sector have historically been unsuccessful. Many proposed large-scale agricultural projects were either dropped or failed. In a 2013 column in the Nassau Tribune, columnist Larry Smith wrote that food self-sufficiency and commercial agriculture operations generating significant economic returns could not realistically be achieved on the Bahamas, with such plans being unviable given dryness and thinness of the Bahamas' soil and labor conditions on the island. Smith wrote that the only viable agriculture industries on the Bahamas were small-scale, such as traditional shifting cultivation, pothole farming, and small tourism-focused farming operations, some of which that have been successful in the Bahamas.

In a 2018 policy analysis making use of producer support estimates, the Inter-American Development Bank recommended eight steps to the Bahamian government to foster a more efficient, internationally competitive agriculture and fisheries sectors in the country. The IADB recommended reducing government involvement to avoiding crowding out private investment and cutting excessive regulation; strengthening the efficiency of agricultural policy; evaluating pest and disease control services (such as inspection, extension, and best-practices education); reducing trade barriers and creating long-term plans for agricultural roads, harbors, irrigation, and post-harvest infrastructure; modernizing and enhancing the collection of agricultural statistics; improving farmers' access to timely market information; taking steps to improve the sectors' profitability and productivity (with the goal of fostering "a possibly small but efficient agricultural sector" to "exploit some specific competitive advantages in a few niche subsectors") and reducing government market price support to fisheries.

=== International participation ===
The Bahamas joined the United Nations Food and Agriculture Organization in 1975.

=== Agriculture ===
Among non-fish agricultural exports of the Bahamas, 43% are corals, mollusk shells, and crustaceans; 28% are beverages, spirits, and tobacco; 10% are "other animal products unfit for human consumption"; 9% are vegetables, and 6% are oilseeds.

Citrus (grapefruit and orange) exports were once a major source of revenue, but was devastated after a 2005 citrus canker outbreak and a spate of hurricanes; the Bahamas' grapefruit industry, however, remains the most productive in the Caribbean. Other than citrus, notable agricultural subsectors include bananas, mangos, vegetables (mostly tomatoes, avocadoes, and onion), livestock, and poultry.

Some products receive market price support from the Bahamian government, while others do not.

=== Fisheries ===
==== Caribbean spiny lobster ====
Among "agri-food" exports, more than 90% are fish and crustaceans, which are mostly exported to the European Union, United States, and Canada. In the fisheries sector, the dominant product and principal export is the Caribbean spiny lobster (Panulirus argus). It is the sole "truly large-scale" commercial fishery in the Bahamas, making up 90% of the country's total fishery exports from 2010 to 2015 and accounted for 55% of its landings by volume in 2004. Lobster fishing provided about 9,300 jobs in 2009, and about 9,000 full- and part-time jobs in 2016, The Caribbean spiny lobster is high-value, and from 1995 to 2015 it made up 80–90% of the total value of the Bahamas' fisheries landings. More than 90% of Caribbean spiny lobsters landed are exported as tails. The Bahamas was the second largest importer of Caribbean spiny lobster imports to the United States (13% of the total), second only to Brazil (which was the source of 22% of Caribbean spiny lobster imports to the U.S.).

The crustacean is fished using casitas ("little houses"), also called lobster condos, on the ocean floor. Wooden "lathe" traps are also used. Beginning in 2009, the Bahamas Marine Exporters Association worked with the World Wildlife Fund, Bahamas Department of Marine Resources, and The Nature Conservancy to improve the sustainability of the spiny lobster fishery. In January 2017, the group decided to seek Marine Stewardship Council (MSC) certification for the fishery. In August 2018, following a 19-month assessment, the Bahamian spiny lobster fishery achieved MSC certification, entitling the products to be sold under the MSC's "blue fish" label and becoming the first Caribbean fishery to participate in the MSC program.

==== Other current and historic fisheries ====
Other fisheries in the Bahamas targeted for commercial and subsistence fishing include queen conch (Strombus gigas), groupers (Epinephelidae), and snapper (Lutjanidae), as well as grunts (Haemulidae) and jacks (Carangidae).

The queen conch is important to Bahamian food culture and is the Bahamas' second-largest fishery, although exports to the United States amount to a modest $1–2 million per year. Although queen conch are protected within the Exuma Cays Land and Sea Park, overfishing (serial depletion) over two decades led to a dramatic decline in the population and age of queen conch stocks in the Bahamas by the late 2010s, posing the risk of fishery collapse. Around 2% of the population are thought to fish the conch. The fishery may not be commercially viable by the end of the 2020s. Queen conch stocks are more abundant and older (as indicated by larger shell size, specifically lip thickness) at Cay Sal Bank, a remote site inaccessible to most fishermen, suggesting that it is a potential natural refuge.

The Nassau grouper (Epinephelus striatus) is an iconic species that is important both as a commercial fishery and in the dive and tourism industry. Because the species is endangered and is on the IUCN Red List, strict fishing regulations apply to it.

In addition to the three principal commercial fisheries (Caribbean spiny lobster, queen conch and grouper), the Bahamas supports a number of emerging fisheries, including parrotfishes (Scarinae), sea cucumbers (holothurians) and gorgonians. The emerging fisheries have the potential to boost the country's economic and enhance food security, but also present fisheries-management challenge due to a lack of data and the risks of overfishing and poor conservation.

Florida stone crab (Menippe mercenaria) is native to the Bahamas, but is not sufficiently abundant to support a full commercial fishery. Data suggests that the stone crab densities in Bahamian waters may be 1% or less compared to the densities in Florida. The Bahamas historically had a limited commercial shark fishing industry, but commercial longlines were banned in 1993, and in 2011 the Bahamian government declared the country a shark sanctuary, barring the harvest of sharks throughout the Bahamian exclusive economic zone. These conservation measures mean that there is "virtually no commercial harvest of elasmobranchs" within the country; shark-dive tourism continues to be economically important. Four sea turtle species, the green turtle (Chelonia mydas), loggerhead turtle (Caretta caretta), hawksbill turtle (Eretmochelys imbricata), and leatherback turtle (Dermochelys coriacea), are present in Bahamian waters. Turtles and turtle eggs were historically harvested in the Bahamas, mostly for local income or consumption, with 52 tonnes of sea turtles landed in 1985. In 1986, the Bahamas legally protected the hawksbill turtle, and in 2009, the Bahamas enacted legislation that protected all sea turtles in Bahamian waters, and barred the harvesting of turtles and eggs, although poaching continues.
