= Producer support estimate =

The producer support estimate (PSE) (formerly producer subsidy equivalent) is an indicator of the annual monetary value of gross transfers from consumers and the state to agricultural producers, measured at the farm gate level, arising from policy measures that support agriculture, regardless of their nature, objectives or impacts on farm production or income. Examples include market price support, and payments based on output, area planted, animal numbers, inputs, or farm income. PSEs, which are updated and published annually by the Organisation for Economic Co-operation and Development, can be expressed in monetary terms: as a ratio to the value of gross farm receipts valued at farm gate prices, including budgetary support (percentage PSE); or, as a ratio to the value of gross farm receipts valued at world market prices, without budgetary support.

== See also ==
- Consumer support estimate (CSE),
- Effective rate of protection
- General services support estimate (GSSE)
- Total support estimate (TSE)
