= Effective rate of protection =

Total effect of entire tariff structure

In economics, the effective rate of protection (ERP) is a measure of the total effect of the entire tariff structure on the value added per unit of output in each industry, when both intermediate and final goods are imported. This statistic is used by economists to measure the real amount of protection afforded to a particular industry by import duties, tariffs or other trade restrictions.

== History ==
Early work on the concept was undertaken by Clarence Barber. The idea was developed and applied to policy analysis by Max Corden.

== Explanation ==
Consider a simple case: there is a tradable good (shoes) that uses one tradable input to produce (leather). Both shoes and leather are imported into the home country. Suppose that in the absence of any tariffs, shoes use $100 worth of leather to make, and shoes sell for $150 in the international markets. Shoemakers around the world add $50 of value. If the home country imposes a 20% tariff on shoes, but no tariff on leather, shoes would sell for $180 in the home country, and the value added for the domestic shoe maker would increase by $30, from $50 to $80. The domestic shoe maker is afforded a 60% effective rate of protection per dollar of value added.

This equals $(VA$_{d}/$VA$_{int} - $1$, where:

VA_{d} = domestic value added
VA_{int} = international value added

An alternative that yields an identical answer is that the effective rate of protection equals $(T$_{f} $- T$_{i})$/VA$_{int}, where:

T_{f} = the total tariff theoretically or actually paid on the final product
T_{i} = the total tariffs paid, theoretically or actually, on the importable inputs used to make that product.

The effective rate of protection is used to estimate the protection really afforded to domestic producers at each stage of production, i.e., how much extra they can charge and still be competitive with imported goods. If the total value of the tariffs on importable inputs exceeds that on the output, the effective rate of protection is negative, i.e., the industry is discriminated against in comparison with the imported product.

In this context, it does not matter whether the final product or the inputs used to make it were actually imported or not. What is important is that they are importable. If so, the implied tariffs should be included in the above formulas because, even if the item was not actually imported, the existence of the tariff should have raised its price in the local market by an equivalent value.

The effective rate of protection reveals the extremely adverse effect of tariffs that escalate from low rates on raw materials to high rates on intermediate inputs and yet higher rates on the final product as, in fact, most countries' tariff schedules do. Less developed countries complain that such tariff schedules gravely impede their access to developed countries' markets.

== See also ==
- Consumer support estimate (CSE),
- General services support estimate (GSSE)
- Total support estimate (TSE)
