= GSSE =

GSSE may refer to:

- Games of the Small States of Europe, a sports competition
- Generic Substation State Events in electrical power distribution
- General Services Support Estimate, a measure of agricultural subsidies
- Group for a Switzerland Without an Army, campaign against Swiss militarisation
