= Timeline of the Great Depression =

The initial economic collapse which resulted in the Great Depression can be divided into two parts: 1929 to mid-1931, and then mid-1931 to 1933. The initial decline lasted from mid-1929 to mid-1931. During this time, most people believed that the decline was merely a bad recession, worse than the recessions that occurred in 1923 and 1927, but not as bad as the Depression of 1920–1921. Economic forecasters throughout 1930 optimistically predicted an economic rebound come 1931, and felt vindicated by a stock market rally in the spring of 1930.

The stock market crash in the first few weeks had a limited direct effect on the broader economy, as only 16% of the U.S. population was invested in the market in any form. But thousands of investors and banks lost money when 10% of invested wealth was lost almost overnight, with prospect of further losses. The crash created uncertainty in people's minds about the future of the economy. This distrust in future income reduced consumption expenditure. As demand for commodities decreased, so did their prices. However, many banks that had engaged in risky investments in the stock market, and/or had lent money to individuals engaged in trading, suffered balance sheet losses that reduced their capital ratios. Mounting losses from further stock market declines and a worsening macro-economy would further strain the banking system. Over $34 million in wealth would be lost from the collapses in leverage investment products in 1929 offered by Goldman Sachs alone.

An increasing number of bank failures in late-1930 interrupted the process of credit creation and reduced the money supply, harming consumption. After a second round of banking panics in mid-1931, there was a major change in people's expectations about the future of the economy. This fear of reduced future income coupled with the Federal Reserve's deflationary monetary policy resulted in a deflationary spiral that cratered consumer spending, business investment, and industrial production. This further depressed the economy until Roosevelt stepped into office in 1933 and ended the gold standard, thereby ending the deflationary policy.

A true understanding of the Great Depression requires not only knowledge of the U.S. monetary system but also the implications of the gold standard on its participatory nations. The gold standard made the involved nations interdependent on each other's policies. Due to a fixed exchange rate, the only way to affect the demand for gold was through interest rates. For example, if interest rates were high in one country, then investors would have no reason to exchange currency for gold and the gold reserves would remain stable. However, if interest rates were low in a different country then its investors would elect to move their funds abroad where interest rates were higher. In order to stop this from happening, each nation within the gold standard union had no choice but to raise its interest rates in correspondence with its fellow nation. This interconnectivity of deflationary policy amongst so many nations resulted in the prolongation of the greatest economic downturn.

This article focuses on the economic milestones, with some mention of the political and social impact of the depression on nations and classes in a global context.

== 1929 ==
January – June: the Roaring Twenties continue unabated. The combined net profits of 536 manufacturing and trading companies showed a 36.6% increase over the same period in 1928, with steel production leading the way. Retail sales, construction starts, and railroad revenues set record after record. Publicly listed shares continue to make record gains. An enormous surplus of wheat from 1928 drives down wheat prices, straining agricultural markets and farmers' incomes. Unemployment hovers around a robust 4%. US nominal GDP is $105 billion (it would not reach this level again until 1941).

March 25: a mini-stock market crash occurs after the Federal Reserve warns of excessive speculation. However, the mini-crash was averted two days later when National City Bank pumped $25 million in credit into the stock market.

Summer: Consumer spending and industrial production begin to stagnate both in the United States and around the world. The Federal Reserve continues with its plan to raise interest rates from 4% in mid-1928 to 6% by mid-1929 in an attempt to combat speculative behavior. The increase in interest rates in the United States, the largest creditor nation in the world, reduces lending to other countries, and contributes to debtor nations such as Germany, Brazil, and Argentina entering economic downturns in 1928 and 1929.

June 15: the Agricultural Marketing Act of 1929 is signed into law, providing some $100 million in emergency loans to struggling farmers.

May–September: The stock market makes almost entirely uninterrupted gains, gaining 20% over this period.

August: a minor recession begins, two months before the Stock Market Crash. Steel production and automobile & house sales notably decline, construction stagnates, and consumer debt was reaching dangerous levels on account of easy credit. Over $8.5 billion of margin loans for stocks were outstanding, worth more than all currency circulating in the United States at the time.

September 3: The Dow Jones Industrial Average peaks at 381.17. The stock market would not regain this peak until November 23, 1954.

September 20: The London Stock Exchange crashes after the collapse of Hatry Group on charges of fraud and forgery. £24 million in value is wiped out. The collapse shakes the confidence of American investors in the security of overseas investments.

October 24: Wall Street Crash of 1929 begins. Stocks lose over 11% of their value upon the opening bell.

October 25–27: Brief recovery on the market.

October 29: 'Black Tuesday'. The New York Stock Exchange collapses, the Dow Jones closing down over 12%.

October 30: one day recovery

November 1: The Federal Reserve begins lowering the discount rate from its 6% level.

November 13: The stock market bottoms out at 198.60, followed by a declining market that would last until April 1930. Commodity prices, however, continue to decline steeply.

== 1930 ==
Year: recession deepens. US GDP contracts by 8.5% and nominal GDP falls to $92 billion. Prices decline slightly but wages hold relatively steady. US annual inflation rate is −6.4%. Unemployment reaches 9%. 1,350 banks fail.

April 17: Dow reaches a secondary closing peak (i.e., bear market rally) of 294.07, followed by a long stagnation until a severe decline began in April 1931. This peak matches early-1929 levels, but is 30% below the September 1929 peak.

May: Automobile sales fall below 1928 levels.

June 17: Smoot-Hawley Tariff Act passed, placing more stress on the weakening global economy, primarily through the collapse in trade of agricultural products, which strained banks that had lent heavily to farmers. Further decreases in trade of manufactured products led to layoffs and reduced corporate profits, weakening the economy. General consensus among economists is that the Smoot-Hawley Act did not cause the Depression, but did worsen it and stunted recovery efforts after 1933. Exports declined from $5.2 billion in 1929 to just $1.7 billion in 1933.

September – December: First major round of U.S. bank failures. Some $550 million in deposits are lost. Over 300 banks failed in December alone.

September 14: The 1930 German federal election is held, with strong gains for the Nazis, who become the second-largest party in the Reichstag, and the Communists. The parties constituting the incumbent pro-democratic Weimar Coalition suffer catastrophic losses.

November: Caldwell & Company, a major conglomerate offering banking, insurance, and brokerage services in the Southern United States, collapses and triggered a cascading effect of bank runs on smaller banks in Tennessee and Kentucky. The collapse generates national headlines, contributing to the contagion of fear regarding the banking system.

December: The Federal Reserve's federal funds rate reaches 2%, a then-record low.

December: Bank of United States (a private bank in New York City) collapses. The bank had over $160 million in deposits and was the fourth largest bank in the United States at the time, and its failure is widely considered to be the moment when the banking collapse in the United States hit a critical mass, sparking a nationwide run on the banking system that was a major contributor to the deflationary spiral of 1931–1933.

== 1931 ==
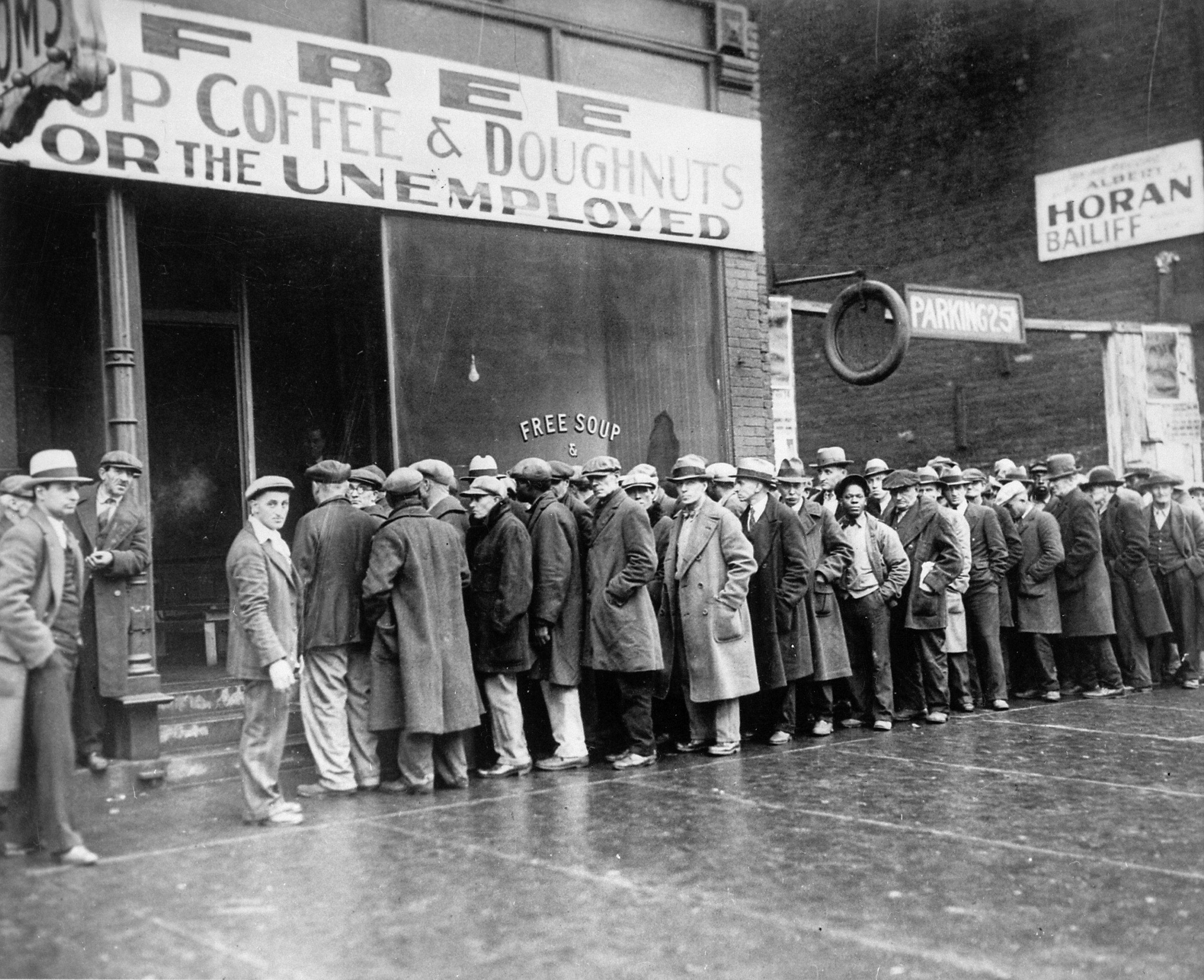
Unemployed men outside a soup kitchen in Depression-era Chicago, Illinois, the US, 1931.

Year: 2,294 banks went down with nearly $1.7 billion in deposits. 28,285 businesses failed for a daily rate of 133 failures in 1931. Unemployment rises to 16%. US nominal GDP falls to $77 billion, and growth is −8.5%. Annual inflation is −9.3%.

May 11: Creditanstalt, Austria's premier bank with major stakes across a variety of industries, becomes insolvent after being forced to assume liabilities from three other insolvent banks, triggering a cascading effect of bank failures across Central Europe. Creditanstalt represented 16% of Austria's GDP, and could not find another institution to guarantee liquidity. 140 million Austrian schillings were lost. The collapse of Creditanstalt caused the Bank of France, the National Bank of Belgium, the Netherlands Bank, and the Swiss National Bank to begin a run on the U.S. dollar for their gold reserves, and forced the Federal Reserve to raise interest rates from 1.5% to 3.5% to maintain the gold standards, which in turn contributed to the deepening of the Depression and the second round of banking failures in the U.S. during the summer of 1931.

May: The Federal Reserve's federal funds rate bottoms out at 1.5%.

May–June: Second major round of U.S. bank failures and worsening economic situation contributes to permanent change in people's expectation of the economy. This run was centered on bank in Chicago, which suffered from real estate loan defaults. Of the 193 state-chartered banks in the Chicago area in 1929, only 35 would survive to the end of 1933. Chicago area banks engaged heavily in real estate lending between 1923 and 1929, and banks that had greater exposure to the real estate bust were very likely to fail. The deflationary spiral that began earlier in the year rapidly and severely intensifies

June–July: German banking crisis. The Reichsbank loses 840 million marks in less than 3 weeks as investors pull out short-term deposits. Germany's second largest bank, Danatbank, becomes insolvent on July 13. Two day bank holiday is declared. Industry suffers a catastrophic collapse. The Hoover Moratorium is issued June 20, suspending reparation payments from Germany to stabilize the country. Although private banks in New York City and the Bank of England begin emergency lending to Germany, the banking crisis spills over into Hungary and Romania, and the collapse of the economy paves the way for Adolf Hitler's rise in the July 1932 and March 1933 German federal elections. The contagion also puts increasing pressure on the United Kingdom.

August – Deepening deficits and demands for a balanced budget lead to Ramsay MacDonald's Labour government raising taxes by £24 million and cutting spending by £96 million, most controversial was the 20% cut to unemployment benefits (a sum of £64 million). The U.K.'s public debt at the time was 180% of GDP, mostly left over from the expenses of World War I. Public outrage would lead to the Labour Party being virtually destroyed in the October 1931 election.

September 21: Britain leaves the gold standard, and the pound sterling depreciates by 25%. Despite warning of disaster, the departure proves beneficial to the British economy, as exports become more competitive. Additionally, the Bank of England was now free to engage in money creation, and reduced interest rates from 6.00% to 2.00%. Norway and Sweden follow on the 27th, Denmark on the 29th, and Finland on October 12. All four would later join the Sterling Area in 1933 by pegging their currencies to the British Pound. The Nordic countries were, like the United Kingdom, also able to switch to an inflationary monetary policy, allowing economic growth to return and unemployment to fall from 1931 onwards, much earlier than other countries who still clung to the gold standard.

October 27: the United Kingdom General election, 1931 takes place, destroying the Labour Party and delivering a landslide victory to the Conservative Party.

September – October: Substantial amount of dollar assets (primarily Federal Reserve Notes) are converted to gold in the US by European central banks seeking to cover losses from the panic that had been sweeping Europe since the collapse of CreditAnstalt. In response, the Federal Reserve increases the federal funds rate from 1.50% to 3.50% to stabilize the dollar, but this only worsens the Depression as banks are further strained. The New York Federal Reserve Bank had loaned $150 million in gold (some 240 tons) to European central banks, and the wisdom of this was questioned as European countries rapidly abandoned the gold standard. As deflation intensified, real interest rates were magnified and rewarded those who held onto money, thus contributing to the deflationary spiral.

== 1932 ==
Year: Unemployment rises to 23%, GDP growth is −13%, annual inflation rate is −11%, 1,700 banks fail. US nominal GDP falls to $60 billion. Over 13 million in the U.S. are unemployed and 3.5 million in the U.K.

January 22 – the Reconstruction Finance Corporation is created to lend $2 billion to troubled financial institutions that were not part of the Federal Reserve System that were solvent in the long-run. By 1941, the RFC would lend out some $9.5 billion to banks, railroads, and mortgage associations, as well as state and local governments.

April – June: Federal Reserve conducts open market transactions, increasing the money supply by $1 billion.

Summer 1932: Majority of foreign trade restrictions take effect, from Smoot-Hawley in the United States and Imperial Preference in the British Empire. The Import Duties Act 1932 passed in the United Kingdom imposes an initial tariff of 10% on most imports, but this rate is quickly raised to a range of rates from 15% to 33% shortly after the Act is passed.

June 6 – The Revenue Act of 1932 is signed into law, raising taxes on personal income, corporate income, and sales taxes on various goods.

July: U.S. government discontinues open market operations.

July 8: The Dow Jones Industrial Index bottoms out at 41.22, the lowest level recorded in the 20th century and representing an 89% loss from its peak in September 1929.

July 31: The German federal election, July 1932 is held, and the Nazi Party, led by Adolf Hitler, becomes the largest party in the Reichstag (but lacks a majority). For the first time, the combined strength of the Communists and Nazis means that there is an anti-democratic majority in Germany.

November 6: The German federal election, November 1932, the last free and fair all-German election until 1990, is held. A minor setback for the Nazi Party, a campaign of mass violence and intimidation would begin in the run up to the next election in March 1933. Nonetheless, the anti-democratic majority between the Communists and Nazis is narrowly maintained. Hitler is later appointed Chancellor of Germany by President Paul von Hindenburg, and would use the Reichstag fire as a pretext to declare a state of emergency in Germany expanding his powers.

November 8: 1932 United States elections: Franklin D. Roosevelt elected 32nd President of the United States in a landslide, the Democratic Party wins massive majorities in both chambers of Congress.

== 1933 ==
Year: The inflation rate turns positive, at 1% annually. Quarterly GDP growth turns positive by summer, but overall annual rate is −1.3% growth. Unemployment peaks at 25%. 2 million are homeless. Industrial production is half of what it was in 1929. US nominal GDP bottoms out at $57 billion (down from $105 billion in 1929)

February 14: Michigan becomes the first state in the U.S. to declare an indefinite bank holiday, in an attempt to stem the impending collapse of First National Bank of Detroit and the Guardian National Bank of Commerce, the two largest banks in Detroit. First National and Guardian National were threatened with failure if the Ford Motor Company made good on its desire to withdraw all of its deposits in the two banks; Ford needed the cash to cover its $75 million loss in 1932. At this time, over 80% of Detroit's manufacturing capacity laid idle, and over 400,000 people were unemployed. Michigan's bank holiday set off a contagion of fear across the country, and by March 6 an additional 37 states would declare indefinite bank holidays.

March 4: Franklin D. Roosevelt is inaugurated as president.

March 5 – The German federal election, March 1933 is held. The Nazi Party would win a narrow majority of seats, though only in coalition with the German National People's Party (DNVP). Though this would be the last free election before World War II, it is not considered to be a fair election, as the Nazi Party's paramilitary organizations waged a campaign of violence, censorship, intimidation, and harassment against all parties that opposed them with state support. Surveillance of voting was conducted on the day of the election itself.

March 6 – Executive Order 2009 suspends all banking activity for one week, in response to renewed stress on major New York City banks that threatened another round of bank failures and further deepening of the Depression. By this time, 38 states had declared bank holidays.

March 9- The Emergency Banking Act was enacted, which enabled a restructuring of the banking system. Over 4,000 banks with $3.6 billion in deposits that were deemed irreparably insolvent were closed forever, but by March 15, banks controlling some 90% of the nation's banking activities were back in business. By the end of March, over $1.1 billion in hoarded cash was deposited into the banking system. These new deposits saved cash-starved banks and helped restart the money creation process after years of credit contraction.

March 20 – The controversial Economy Act of 1933 is signed into law, slashing $243 million in government salaries and pensions, and veterans' benefits. Despite the economic crisis, supermajorities of American economists, policymakers, and the general public believed that the federal government needed to balance the budget and avoid deficit spending, to avoid putting further strain on the bond market which would negatively affect government borrowing costs, banks, corporations, and foreign investors. From 1929 to 1933, the total debt owed by the U.S. government rose from $16.9 billion to over $23 billion. This "Economy" Act was designed to reduce government outlays and assuage fears about government debt and deficits.

March 31 – The Civilian Conservation Corps, a public works relief program, is created. It would last until 1942 and is an icon of the New Deal programs.

April 5 – Executive Order 6102 of President Franklin D. Roosevelt issued, forbidding hoarding of gold coin, bullion, and certificates, effective from May 1, 1933

May 12 – the Agricultural Adjustment Act is enacted, designed to boost agricultural prices by reducing surpluses.

May 27 – the Securities Act of 1933 is enacted, requiring the registration of all sales and purchases of financial securities, as well as the disclosure of critical financial information about the firms involved. The U.S. Securities and Exchange Commission was established the following year, which helped combat insider trading and reducing transaction risk.

June 16 - the 1933 Banking Act is enacted, establishing the Federal Deposit Insurance Corporation (FDIC), creating the Federal Open Market Committee, and separating commercial banking from investment banking with Glass–Steagall legislation.

July – Federal Reserve industrial production index rebounds to 85.5, a 57% increase over the 54.3 recorded in March 1933

November 8 – the Civil Works Administration is created, which would employ over 4 million people and distribute over $400 million in funds for work programs through its end on March 31, 1934, when it would be replaced by the more permanent Works Progress Administration

December 5 – Prohibition is repealed at the national level. 18 states continue with state-level prohibition. The end of Prohibition hurts organized crime, allows legal employment in alcoholic drink production, and increases state tax revenues.

== See also ==
- 1930s
- Causes of the Great Depression
- Great Contraction
- Interwar period, worldwide
- International relations (1919–1939)
- Timeline of the 20th century, since 1900
- Timeline of events preceding World War II
  - Events preceding World War II in Europe
  - Events preceding World War II in Asia

== Timelines ==
- Worldwide. Thomas E. Hall; J. David Ferguson (2009). The Great Depression: An International Disaster of Perverse Economic Policies. University of Michigan Press. pp. 15–. ISBN 978-0472023325.\
- USA US overview 1928-1941
- US-President Roosevelt F.D.R.
- US-Multimedia Politics and Society; Science and Technology; Arts and Culture; and World Events
- US-New Deal New Deal timeline United States USA
