= Consumer support estimate =

The Consumer support estimate (CSE) is an OECD indicator of the annual monetary value of gross transfers to (from) consumers of agricultural commodities, measured at the farm gate level, arising from policy measures which support agriculture, regardless of their nature, objectives or impacts on consumption of farm products. The CSE can be expressed in monetary terms; as a ratio to the value of consumption expenditure valued at farm gate prices, including budgetary support to consumers (percentage CSE); or as a ratio to the value of consumption expenditure valued at world market prices, without budgetary support to consumers.

== See also ==
- Effective rate of protection
- Producer support estimate
- General services support estimate
- Total support estimate
