= The Review of Economics and Statistics =

- Discipline: Econometrics
- Language: English
- Edited by: Will Dobbie, Raymond Fisman

Publication details
- Former name: The Review of Economic Statistics
- History: 1919–present
- Publisher: MIT Press for the John F. Kennedy School of Government (United States)
- Frequency: 5/year
- Impact factor: 8.0 (2022)

Standard abbreviations
- ISO 4: Rev. Econ. Stat.

Indexing
- CODEN: RECSA9
- ISSN: 0034-6535 (print); 1530-9142 (web)
- LCCN: 20022219
- JSTOR: 00346535
- OCLC no.: 181820356

Links
- Journal homepage; Online access

The Review of Economics and Statistics is a peer-reviewed academic journal that covers applied economics, with specific relevance to the scope of econometrics. The editors-in-chief are Will Dobbie (Harvard University) and Raymond Fisman (Boston University). The journal is over 100 years old.

== History ==
The journal, founded initially as The Review of Economic Statistics at Harvard University in 1917, published its official “inaugural volume” in 1919. The journal obtained its current title in 1948.

As the first editor-in-chief, Charles J. Bullock remarked in his Prefatory Statement to the first issue that "the purpose of the Review is to promote the collection, criticism, and interpretation of economic statistics, with a view to making them more accurate and valuable than they are at present for business and scientific purposes."

=== Editors-in-chief ===
The following persons are or have been editors-in-chief:

- Charles J. Bullock (1919–1924)
- Allyn A. Young (1921–1924)
- Edmund E. Day (1921–1924)
- Joseph S. Davis (1921–1924)
- John H. Williams (1921–1924, 1939–1948)
- Arthur E. Monroe (1921–1924)
- Joseph L. Snider (1921–1924)
- Warren M. Persons (1921–1928)
- Elizabeth Boody (1923–1924)
- William L. Crum (1928–1930, 1935–1947)
- Edwin Frickey (1931)
- Joseph B. Hubbard (1932–1934)
- Arthur H. Cole (1935–1948)
- Harold H. Burbank (1935–1948)
- Seymour E. Harris (1935–1964)
- Edward S. Mason (1935–1948)
- Joseph A. Schumpeter (1935–1948)
- John D. Black (1936–1948)
- Gottfried von Haberler (1936–1948)
- Alvin H. Hansen (1939–1948)
- Sumner H. Slichter (1939–1948)
- Wassily W. Leontief (1945–1948)
- John Litner (1965)
- Otto Eckstein (1966–1971)
- Hendrick S. Houthakker (1972–1992)
- Richard E. Caves (1992–1996)
- Robert A. Moffitt (1992–1998)
- James H. Stock (1992–2002)
- C. Peter Timmer (1992–1995)
- John Y. Campbell (1996–2002)
- Robert S. Pindyck (1997–2002)
- George J. Borjas (1999–2006)
- K. Daron Acemoglu (2002–2007)
- Dani Rodrik (2003–2008)
- Julio J. Rotemberg (2003–2008)
- Esther C. Duflo (2007)
- Alberto Abadie (2007–2011)
- Michael Greenstone (2007–2010)
- Philippe Aghion (2008–2015)
- Mark W. Watson (2008–2014)
- Gordon Hanson (2011–2015)
- Asim Ijaz Khwaja (2011–present)
- Amitabh Chandra (2012–present)
- David S. Lee (2012–2013)
- Bryan S. Graham (2014–present)
- Yuriy Gorodnichenko (2015–2017)
- Emir Kamenica (2016–2017)
- Amit K. Khandelwal (2016–present)
- Brigitte Madrian (2016–2018)
- Rohini Pande (2016–present)
- Shschar Kariv (2016–present)
- Olivier Coibion (2018–present)

== Notable papers ==
The following papers have been cited most:

Date of Publication	Vol & Issue	Title of Article	Author(s)
November 1, 2006	88:4	The Log of Gravity	J.M.C. Santos Silva, Silvana Tenreyro
February 1, 2002	84:1	Propensity Score-Matching Methods for Nonexperimental Causal Studies	Rajeev H. Dehejia, Sadek Wahba
August 1, 2008	90:3	Bootstrap-Based Improvements for Inference with Clustered Errors	A. Colin Cameron, Jonah B. Gelbach, Douglas L. Miller
November 1, 1998	80:4	Consistent Covariance Matrix Estimation with Spatially Dependent Panel Data	John C. Driscoll, Aart C. Kraay
February 1, 2004	86:1	Nonparametric Estimation of Average Treatment Effects Under Exogeneity: A Review	Guido W. Imbens
