= Clarence Barber =

Canadian economist and academic

Clarence Lyle Barber
- Born: May 5, 1917; Wolseley, Saskatchewan, Canada
- Died: February 27, 2004 (aged 86); Oak Bay, British Columbia
- Occupations: economist and academic
- Awards: Order of Canada; Order of Manitoba

Clarence Lyle Barber OC OM FRSC (May 5, 1917 – February 27, 2004) was a Canadian economist and academic.

Born in Wolseley, Saskatchewan, he received a B.A. in economics from the University of Saskatchewan in 1939. He won a scholarship to Clark University where he obtained his M.A. in 1941 and he received a Ph.D. in 1952 from the University of Minnesota.

He taught economics at the University of Manitoba from 1949 to 1982 and served as head of the department from 1963 to 1972. Barber also taught at McMaster University, Queen's University, McGill University, and the University of Victoria. His professional interests included macroeconomic theory, international economics, and monetary theory. Barber's best known theoretical contribution was his formulation of the concept of the effective rate of protection. He spent the year 1959-60 living in Manila, Philippines as an advisor working for the United Nations providing assistance to the 1960 Census.

Effects of the Great Depression in his youth motivated Barber to study economics . In 1978, Barber wrote "On the Causes of the Great Depression" where he made a link between demographics and economics. He cited how demand for housing in the U.S. began to drop beginning in 1926. Early in 1929, demand for housing dropped precipitously. The stock market crash in October of that same year was preceded by a decline in demand, Barber argues, that began with a lower formation of households concomitant with lower rates of marriage. After World War I, a birth dearth had resulted; a dearth that demographers have shown did not end until World War II ended. (see Causes of the Great Depression) The death of young men as soldiers in World War I, coupled with the Flu Pandemic of 1918 wrought their eventual harm to the economy as a whole. The increase in secularization during the 'Roaring Twenties', as automobiles became widespread, and availability of electricity and electrical appliances and such, may have had its effect too. Barber showed in "On Causes..." that lower demand for mortgages and other loans preceded by some years a shortage of loan availability as the Great Depression deepened towards 1933.

After the Winnipeg flood of 1950, he was economic adviser and director of research for the Manitoba Royal Commission Flood Cost-Benefit from 1957 to 1959. The commission recommended the construction of the Red River Floodway. In 1987, he was made an Officer of the Order of Canada. In 2001, he was awarded the Order of Manitoba.

In 1958-59 Barber served as the President of the Canadian Association of University Teachers (CAUT). During his tenure the CAUT dealt with a major controversy that arose as a consequence of the dismissal of Harry Crowe by United College (now the University of Winnipeg). The CAUT appointed a committee of inquiry consisting of Bora Laskin of the University of Toronto and V.C. Fowke of the University of Saskatchewan to investigate the circumstances of Crowe's dismissal and make recommendations.

Barber was appointed in May 1966 as sole commissioner on the Royal Commission on Farm Machinery. His report was delivered in May 1971.

During the year 1972-73 Barber was President of the Canadian Economics Association.

In 1947, he married Barbara Anne Patchet. They had four children: Paul, Stephen, David, and Alan.

From 1982 to 1985 Clarence served on the Royal Commission on Economic Union and Development Prospects For Canada, more commonly known as the Macdonald Commission. It was on this commission where he argued for free trade with the United States.
