= Total support estimate =

The total support estimate (TSE) is an Organisation for Economic Co-operation and Development (OECD) indicator of the annual monetary value of all gross transfers from taxpayers and consumers arising from policy measures that support agriculture, net of the associated budgetary receipts, regardless of their objectives and impacts on farm production and income, or consumption of farm products. The TSE can be expressed in monetary terms or as a percentage of the gross domestic product. In addition to the TSE, other measures used to compare levels of support to agriculture across counties include the producer support estimate (PSE), consumer support estimate (CSE), and general services support estimate (GSSE).
