= Slavery in the Bahamas =

Slavery in the Bahamas dates back several centuries.

== 19th century ==
=== Golden Grove uprising ===
In December 1831, a riot occurred led by slaves on the estate of Joseph Hunter, who held the largest amount of slaves on Golden Grove. Although the Consolidated Slave Act of 1797 stated that all slaves were entitled to rest on Christmas and the next two working days, Christmas in 1831 was on a Sunday which had already been an official rest day for slaves since 1830. Therefore, it was up to their owners to determine when their one outstanding rest day would be repaid. However, the slaves owned by Hunter were displeased with his designation of the Saturday before Christmas week as their rest day; they continued to work on Saturday, collecting their Christmas allowances on Sunday instead, and demanded that Wednesday be their holiday. At the direction of senior enslaved "Black Dick" Deveaux, the enslaved defied Hunter's orders to harvest corn on Wednesday and some were even accused by Hunter of stealing fruit. On 30 December, Black Dick, his sons, Wally and Richard, and the other enslaved surrounded the Hunter estate; Black Dick and his sons were armed with muskets, although enslaved people were not permitted by law to bear firearms. A shootout ensued with no fatalities and the rebellion lasted for three days, while Hunter made preparations to leave for Nassau in early January 1832. The perpetrators were subsequently arrested by the Second West India Regiment and stood trial on 25 January 1832; Black Dick and six other enslaved peoples were sentenced to death by hanging.

=== The end of enslavement ===
Enslavement was legally ended in all British colonies in 1833. The Creole case of 7 November 1841, which has been described as "the most successful revolt of enslaved people in U.S. history", a mutiny occurred on the New Orleans-bound Creole, which was transporting some 135 enslaved from Richmond, Virginia. After wounding the captain and killing one of the enslavers, the mutineers navigated the ship to the Bahamas, where all the enslaved onboard ultimately found their freedom.

== Modern era ==
In 1992, the Pompey Museum of Slavery and Emancipation, named after "a courageous slave, Pompey, who lived on the Rolle Plantation on Steventon, Exuma", was established at the former Vendue House marketplace at Bay Street, Nassau. In October 2013, following a Caribbean Community (CARICOM) meeting on reparations in Saint Vincent and the Grenadines, the Bahamas joined 13 other CARICOM states in formally demanding slavery compensation from Britain, Holland, and France.
