= Liquidationism (economics) =

Macroeconomics theory

Liquidationism is the heterodox Austrian school belief in economics that no actions to mitigate the effects of recessions should be taken by the government or the central bank, but, rather, that the "temporary pain" of companies being liquidated, on account of crises, is a solution in itself. In contrast, mainstream economists think that "we have every reason to think that governmental efforts to provide liquidity and fiscal stimulus, and to prevent the panic of contagion from collapsing the financial system, are warranted."

The term refers to several positions, chiefly associated with the Austrian school of economics, but held by some economists outside the tradition as well. Liquidationists hold that recessions perform a necessary corrective economic function by liquidating unsound investments and inefficient firms accumulated during a boom; and that the intervention of the government or the central bank to prevent it through fiscal stimulus, monetary expansion, or bailouts simply postpone and may worsen a future bust.

== Theoretical basis ==
Liquidationism is closely linked to the Austrian business cycle theory, which holds that artificially low interest rates, generally produced by credit expansion from the central bank, cause "malinvestments". The low interest rates lead to misallocation of capital into projects that are unprofitable because of the distorted cost of capital. In this view, recession following a boom is not random or purely destructive event, but the process of markets correcting themselves, restoring prudent allocation of capital and labor. Further, the theory argues policies aimed at propping up prices, wages, or bailing out failing firms during a recession interfere with this corrective process and lay down another cycle of malinvestments, setting another boom and postponing the bust.

== Proponents ==
Liquidationism was the commonly held view among economists prior to Keynesian Revolution, with Friedrich Hayek, Lionel Robbins, and Joseph Schumpeter being the leading figures. In January 1934, a column quoted Mr Schumpeter stating;

"Any revival which is merely due to artificial stimulus ... leaves part of the work of depressions undone and adds, to an undigested remnant of maladjustment, new maladjustment of its own which has to be liquidated in turn, thus threatening business with a crisis ahead."

In his memoirs, President Herbert Hoover, referring to Andrew Mellon as belonging to "leave it alone liquidationists", quoted him as saying;

"It will purge the rottenness out of the system. High costs of living and high living will come down. People will work harder, live a more moral life. Values will be adjusted, and enterprising people will pick up the wrecks from less competent people."

== See also ==
- Corporate welfare
- Bailout
