= Illegal drug trade in the Bahamas =

The illegal drug trade in The Bahamas involves trans-shipment of cocaine and marijuana through The Bahamas to the United States.

In 1982, a report entitled "The Bahamas: A Nation For Sale" by investigative television journalist Brian Ross was aired on NBC in the United States. The report claimed Lynden Pindling and his government accepted bribes from Colombian drug smugglers, particularly the notorious Carlos Lehder, co-founder of the Medellín Cartel, in exchange for allowing the smugglers to use the Bahamas as a transshipment point to smuggle Colombian cocaine into the US. Through murder and extortion, Lehder had gained complete control over the Norman's Cay in Exuma, which became the chief base for smuggling cocaine into the United States.

Lehder boasted to the Colombian media about his involvement in drug trafficking at Norman's Cay and about giving hundreds of thousands of dollars in payoffs to the ruling Progressive Liberal Party, but Pindling vigorously denied the accusations, and made a testy appearance on NBC to rebut them. However, the public outcry led to the creation in 1984 to the Royal Commission of Inquiry into Drug Trafficking and Government Corruption in the Bahamas.

A review of Pindling's personal finances by the Commission found that he had spent eight times his reported total earnings from 1977 to 1984. According to the Inquiry: "The prime minister and Lady Pindling have received at least $57.3 million in cash. Explanations for some of these deposits were given... but could not be verified."

As a result of the Inquiry, five government ministers either resigned or were dismissed.

== Hurricane Dorian ==
On 1 September 2019, Hurricane Dorian hit the Bahamas and caused an incredible amount of damage. Some places were unlivable and a great deal of basic resources were needed. Once the hurricane had passed and it was safe, US forces began to rescue Bahamians and bring them to the US so they could have food, water, habitation and medical relief.

On 9 September 2019, President Donald Trump halted the humanitarian evacuation of the Bahamians claiming "I don't want to allow people that weren't supposed to be in the Bahamas to come into the United States including some very bad people." Trump was referring drug dealers and gang members on the islands.

== See also ==
- Cannabis in the Bahamas
