= Seymour E. Harris =

Seymour Edwin Harris, or Seymour E. Harris, (1897–1974) was an American academic and professor of economics at Harvard University serving as an economic advisor to John F. Kennedy.

== Life ==
Harris was born on September 8, 1897, in New York City. He completed his undergraduate degree in 1920 and his PhD in 1926, both obtained from Harvard University. He began teaching economics at Harvard in 1922. He was the only Jewish member of the faculty. He was made full professor in 1954. At Harvard, one of his students was Alice Bourneuf, who also became his research assistant before she joined federal government service. From 1955 to 1959, he was the chair of Harvard's department of economics. He left Harvard in 1964 to teach at the University of California until 1972.

== Economic views ==
Harris was considered one of the most ardent propagators of Keynesian economics. He is known for opening his lectures at Harvard with the introduction, “I am Seymour Harris, Professor of Economics at Harvard University and author of 33 books”, which were all about Keynes. One of the most notable of these was The New Economics, which he edited and published in 1947 after Keynes' death. This collection of essays constituted an influential body of work that further developed Keynesian ideas. The text was significant because during this period references to Keynes tended to arouse antagonism from conservative thought circles. Harris also served as the editor of The Review of Economics and Statistics in 1943.

During World War II, Harris worked for the government and was involved in several wartime planning projects. He later became the chief economic adviser to Adlai Stevenson II and later to then-Senator John F. Kennedy. Harris was part of the Academicians for Kennedy committee, which was formed to compete with Joseph McCarthy among youths and students. He had enlisted more than 450 college and university faculty members in California.

When Kennedy became president, Harris became part of Kennedy's task force on the economy. He was appointed the chief economic consultant to Secretary of the Treasury, Douglas Dillon, in 1961. Harris also became the chief economic advisor to Lyndon B. Johnson’s administration.

== Select publications ==
- The Assignats (1930)
- Inflation and the American Economy (1945)
- The New Economics (1945)
- European Recovery Program (1948)
- Economics of Programming (1949)
- The Dollar in Crisis (1961)
- Economics of the Kennedy Years (1964)
