= General Services Support Estimate =

The General Services Support Estimate (GSSE) is an Organisation for Economic Co-operation and Development (OECD) indicator of the annual monetary value of gross transfers of general services provided to agriculture collectively, arising from policy measures that support agriculture, regardless of their nature, objectives and impacts on farm production, income, or consumption of farm products. Examples include research and development, education, infrastructure, and marketing and promotion programs. The GSSE can be expressed in monetary terms or as a percentage of the total support to agriculture (percentage GSSE).

== The OECD Description ==
The concept of transfers presumes both a source and a recipient. The indicators identify three economic groups: taxpayers (government), consumers and agricultural producers; the latter are considered both as individual entrepreneurs and collectively. The arrows represent the flow of transfers from one group to another arising from policy measures that support agriculture. An important distinction between the indicators is made on the basis of the recipient of the transfer.

- Producer support estimate (PSE) represents transfers to producers individually. These transfers require that an individual farmer takes actions to produce goods or services, to use factors of production, or to be defined as an eligible farming enterprise or farmer, to receive the transfer.
- General Service Support Estimate (GSSE) includes transfers to producers collectively, i.e. services that benefit agriculture but whose initial incidence is not at the level of individual farmers.
- Consumer support estimate (CSE) captures the value of transfers to consumers. The CSE is almost always negative because transfers from consumers due to market price support policies outweigh any consumption subsidies from taxpayers that might be provided to consumers.
- Total support estimate (TSE) represents the sum of all three components, adjusting for double-counting given that some market price transfers are accounted for in both the PSE and CSE.
