= Market price support =

Indicator developed by The Organisation for Economic Co-operation and Development

Market price support (MPS) is an indicator, developed by the OECD, used in the calculation of Producer and Consumer Subsidy Equivalents (PSE/CSE). The PSE and CSE acronyms were changed in 1999 to Producer and Consumer Support Estimate. MPS is the annual monetary value of gross transfers from consumers and taxpayers to agricultural producers arising from policy measures creating a gap between domestic market prices and border prices of a specific agricultural commodity measured at the farm gate level. Conditional on the production of a specific commodity, MPS includes the transfer to producers associated with both production for domestic use and exports and is measured by the price gap applied to current production. The MPS is net of producer levies on sales of the specific commodity or penalties for not respecting regulations such as production quotas (price levies). In the case of livestock production MPS is net of the market price support on domestically produced coarse grains and oilseeds used as animal feed (excess feed cost).
