= Revenue Act of 1932 =

US tax law

The Revenue Act of 1932 (June 6, 1932, ch. 209, 47 Stat. 169) raised United States tax rates across the board, with the rate on top incomes rising from 25 percent to 63 percent. The estate tax was doubled and corporate taxes were raised by almost 15 percent.

Taxable Items included dye, chewing gum, furs, soft drinks, and sporting goods; firearms, shells, and cartridges; coal, coke, and copper ore; telegraph, telephone, cable, and radio dispatches; and checks, jewelry, matches, refrigerators, stamps, and toiletries, and this act enacted one of the first taxes on gasoline.

The provisions of the act applied to the taxable year of 1932 and all subsequent taxable years.

It was signed into law by President Herbert Hoover.

== Tax on Corporations ==
A rate of 13.75 percent, increased from the prior 12.0 percent, was levied on the net income of corporations.

== Tax on Individuals ==
A Normal Tax and a Surtax were levied against the net income of individuals as shown in the following table.

Revenue Act of 1932; Normal Tax and Surtax on Individuals 47 Stat. 174
Net Income (dollars)	Normal Rate (percent)	Surtax Rate (percent)	Combined Rate (percent)
0	4	0	4
4,000	8	0	8
6,000	8	1	9
10,000	8	2	10
12,000	8	3	11
14,000	8	4	12
16,000	8	5	13
18,000	8	6	14
20,000	8	8	16
22,000	8	9	17
24,000	8	10	18
26,000	8	11	19
28,000	8	12	20
30,000	8	13	21
32,000	8	15	23
36,000	8	16	24
38,000	8	17	25
40,000	8	18	26
42,000	8	19	27
44,000	8	20	28
46,000	8	21	29
48,000	8	22	30
50,000	8	23	31
52,000	8	24	32
54,000	8	25	33
56,000	8	26	34
58,000	8	27	35
60,000	8	28	36
62,000	8	29	37
64,000	8	30	38
66,000	8	31	39
68,000	8	32	40
70,000	8	33	41
72,000	8	34	42
74,000	8	35	43
76,000	8	36	44
78,000	8	37	45
80,000	8	38	46
82,000	8	39	47
84,000	8	40	48
86,000	8	41	49
88,000	8	42	50
90,000	8	43	51
92,000	8	44	52
94,000	8	45	53
96,000	8	46	54
98,000	8	47	55
100,000	8	48	56
150,000	8	49	57
200,000	8	50	58
300,000	8	51	59
400,000	8	52	60
500,000	8	53	61
750,000	8	54	62
1,000,000	8	55	63

- Exemption of $1,000 for single filers and $2,500 for married couples and heads of family. A $400 exemption for each dependent under 18.

== Gift Tax ==
The Act also imposed a gift tax, effective with respect to gifts made on or after June 7, 1932.
