= Monetarism =

School of thought in monetary economics

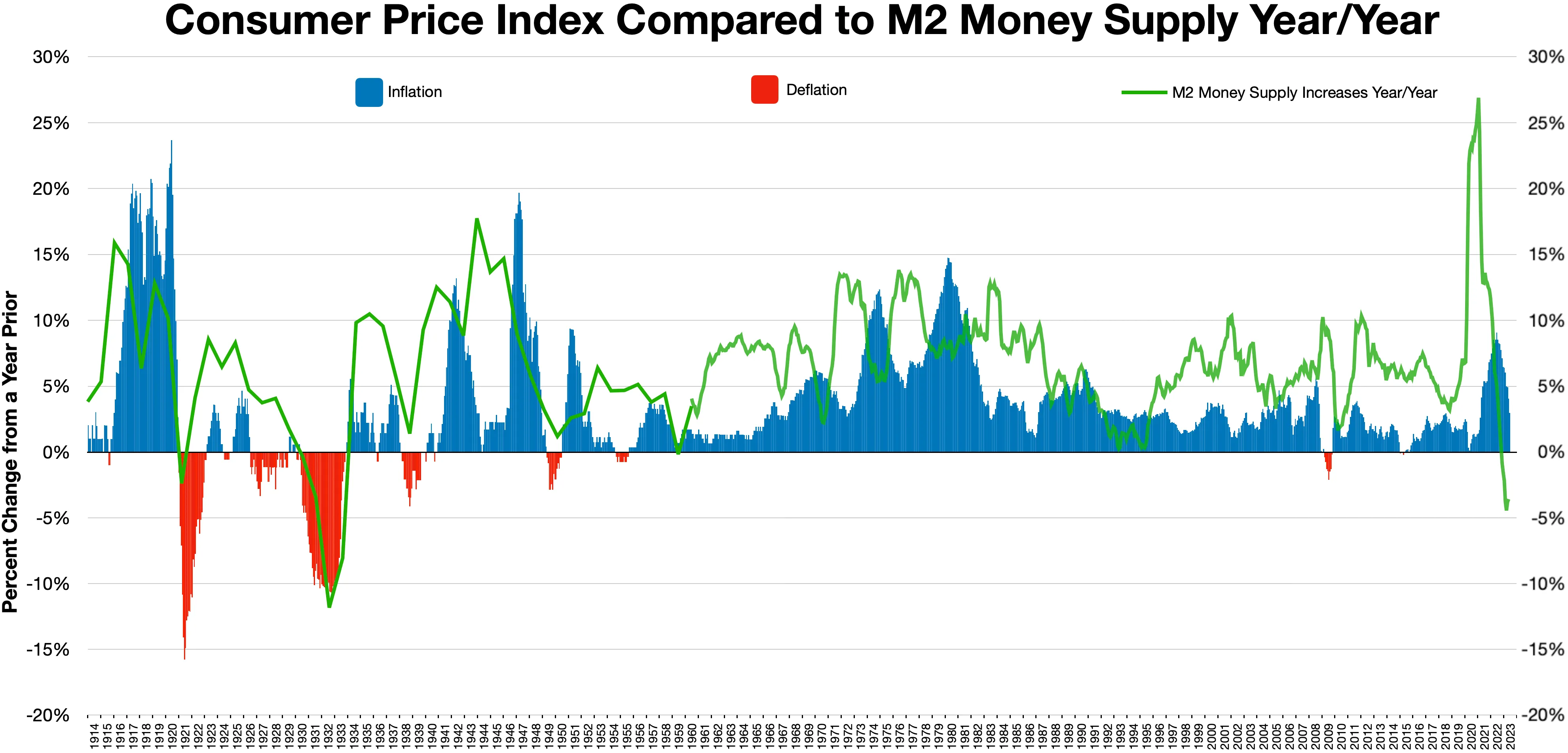
Inflation Deflation M2 money supply increases Year/Year

Monetarism is a school of thought in monetary economics that emphasizes the role of policy-makers in controlling the amount of money in circulation. It gained prominence in the 1970s, but was mostly abandoned as a direct guidance to monetary policy during the following decade in favor of the rise of inflation targeting through movements of the official interest rate.

The monetarist theory states that variations in the money supply have major influences on national output in the short run and on price levels over longer periods. Monetarists assert that the objectives of monetary policy are best met by targeting the growth rate of the money supply rather than by engaging in discretionary monetary policy.

Monetarism is mainly associated with the work of Milton Friedman, who was an influential opponent of Keynesian economics, criticising Keynes's theory of fighting economic downturns using fiscal policy (e.g. government spending). Friedman and Anna Schwartz wrote an influential book, A Monetary History of the United States, 1867–1960, and argued that inflation is "always and everywhere a monetary phenomenon".

Although opposed to the existence of the Federal Reserve, Friedman advocated, given its existence, a central bank policy aimed at keeping the growth of the money supply at a rate commensurate with the growth in productivity and demand for goods. Money growth targeting was mostly abandoned by the central banks who tried it, however. Central banks struggled to identify stable relationships between traditional monetary aggregates and inflation, though some researchers argue that theoretically grounded measures like Divisia aggregates may reveal more consistent patterns. Starting in the early 1990s, most major central banks turned to direct inflation targeting, relying on steering short-run interest rates as their main policy instrument.

Important monetarist views were integrated into the new neoclassical synthesis which appeared in macroeconomics around 2000.

== Description ==
Monetarism is an economic theory that focuses on the macroeconomic effects of the supply of money and central banking. Formulated by Milton Friedman, it argues that excessive expansion of the money supply is inherently inflationary, and that monetary authorities should focus solely on maintaining price stability.

Monetarist theory draws its roots from the quantity theory of money, a centuries-old economic theory which had been put forward by various economists, among them Irving Fisher and Alfred Marshall, before Friedman restated it in 1956.

=== Monetary history of the United States ===
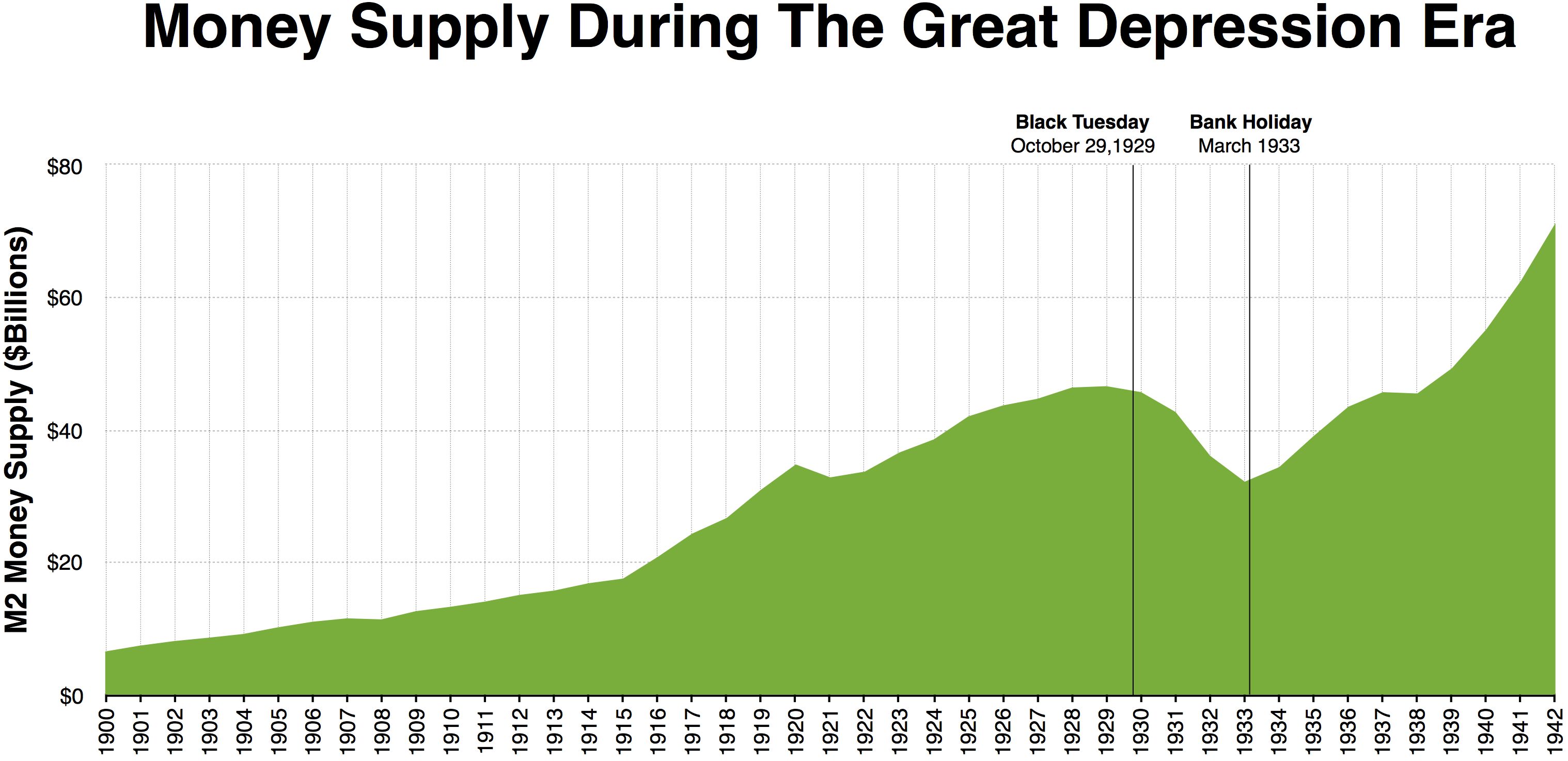
Money supply decreased significantly between Black Tuesday and the Bank Holiday in March 1933 in the wake of massive bank runs across the United States.

Monetarists argued that central banks sometimes caused major unexpected fluctuations in the money supply. Friedman asserted that actively trying to stabilize demand through monetary policy changes can have negative unintended consequences. In part he based this view on the historical analysis of monetary policy, A Monetary History of the United States, 1867–1960, which he coauthored with Anna Schwartz in 1963. The book attributed inflation to excess money supply generated by a central bank. It attributed deflationary spirals to the reverse effect of a failure of a central bank to support the money supply during a liquidity crunch. In particular, the authors argued that the Great Depression of the 1930s was caused by a massive contraction of the money supply (they deemed it "the Great Contraction"), and not by the lack of investment that Keynes had argued. They also maintained that post-war inflation was caused by an over-expansion of the money supply. They made famous the assertion of monetarism that "inflation is always and everywhere a monetary phenomenon."

=== Fixed monetary rule ===
Friedman proposed a fixed monetary rule, called Friedman's k-percent rule, where the money supply would be automatically increased by a fixed percentage per year. The rate should equal the growth rate of real GDP, leaving the price level unchanged. For instance, if the economy is expected to grow at 2 percent in a given year, the Fed should allow the money supply to increase by 2 percent. Because discretionary monetary policy would be as likely to destabilise as to stabilise the economy, Friedman advocated that the Fed be bound to fixed rules in conducting its policy.

However, the effectiveness of such monetary rules may depend critically on how money is measured and incorporated into macroeconomic models. Traditional simple-sum monetary aggregates, which treat all monetary assets as perfect substitutes, may provide misleading signals for monetary policy, particularly during periods of financial innovation. Studies using theoretically-grounded Divisia monetary aggregates have found more stable relationships between money growth, inflation expectations, and economic activity, suggesting that properly measured money can provide clearer guidance for monetary policy implementation. Moreover, incorporating money into forward-looking macroeconomic models with proper measurement can enhance the transmission mechanism of monetary policy and improve the effectiveness of rules-based approaches.

=== Opposition to the gold standard ===
Most monetarists oppose the gold standard. Friedman viewed a pure gold standard as impractical. For example, whereas one of the benefits of the gold standard is that the intrinsic limitations to the growth of the money supply by the use of gold would prevent inflation, if the growth of population or increase in trade outpaces the money supply, there would be no way to counteract deflation and reduced liquidity (and any attendant recession) except for the mining of more gold. But he also admitted that if a government was willing to surrender control over its monetary policy and not to interfere with economic activities, a gold-based economy would be possible.

== Rise ==
Clark Warburton is credited with making the first solid empirical case for the monetarist interpretation of business fluctuations in a series of papers from 1945.^{p. 493} Within mainstream economics, the rise of monetarism started with Milton Friedman's 1956 restatement of the quantity theory of money. Friedman argued that the demand for money could be described as depending on a small number of economic variables.

Thus, according to Friedman, when the money supply expanded, people would not simply wish to hold the extra money in idle money balances; i.e., if they were in equilibrium before the increase, they were already holding money balances to suit their requirements, and thus after the increase they would have money balances surplus to their requirements. These excess money balances would therefore be spent and hence aggregate demand would rise. Similarly, if the money supply were reduced people would want to replenish their holdings of money by reducing their spending. In this, Friedman challenged a simplification attributed to Keynes suggesting that "money does not matter." Thus the word 'monetarist' was coined.

The popularity of monetarism picked up in political circles when the prevailing view of neo-Keynesian economics seemed unable to explain the contradictory problems of rising unemployment and inflation in response to the Nixon shock in 1971 and the oil shocks of 1973.

=== Monetarism in the US and the UK ===
In 1979, United States President Jimmy Carter appointed as Federal Reserve Chief Paul Volcker, who made fighting inflation his primary objective, and who restricted the money supply (in accordance with the Friedman rule) to tame inflation in the economy. The result was a major rise in interest rates, not only in the United States; but worldwide. The "Volcker shock" continued from 1979 to the summer of 1982, decreasing inflation and increasing unemployment.

In May 1979, Margaret Thatcher, Leader of the Conservative Party in the United Kingdom, won the general election, defeating the sitting Labour Government led by James Callaghan. By that time, the UK had endured several years of severe inflation, which was rarely below the 10% mark and stood at 10.3% by the time of the election. Thatcher implemented monetarism as the weapon in her battle against inflation, and succeeded at reducing it to 4.6% by 1983. However, unemployment in the United Kingdom increased from 5.7% in 1979 to 12.2% in 1983, reaching 13.0% in 1982; starting with the first quarter of 1980, the UK economy contracted in terms of real gross domestic product for six straight quarters.

== Decline ==
Monetarist ascendancy was brief, however. The period when major central banks focused on targeting the growth of money supply, reflecting monetarist theory, lasted only for a few years, in the US from 1979 to 1982.

The money supply is useful as a policy target only if the relationship between money and nominal GDP, and therefore inflation, is stable and predictable. This implies that the velocity of money must be predictable. In the 1970s velocity had seemed to increase at a fairly constant rate, but in the 1980s and 1990s velocity became highly unstable, experiencing unpredictable periods of increases and declines. Consequently, the stable correlation between the money supply and nominal GDP broke down, and the usefulness of the monetarist approach came into question. Many economists who had been convinced by monetarism in the 1970s abandoned the approach after this experience.

The changing velocity originated in shifts in the demand for money and created serious problems for the central banks. This provoked a thorough rethinking of monetary policy. In the early 1990s central banks started focusing on targeting inflation directly using the short-run interest rate as their central policy variable, abandoning earlier emphasis on money growth. The new strategy proved successful, and today most major central banks follow a flexible inflation targeting.

== Legacy ==
Aspects of monetarism have found their way into modern mainstream economic thinking. Among them are the belief that controlling inflation should be a primary responsibility of the central bank. It is also widely recognized that monetary policy, as well as fiscal policy, can affect output in the short run. In this way, important monetarist thoughts have been subsumed into the new neoclassical synthesis or consensus view of macroeconomics that emerged in the 2000s.

== Notable proponents ==
- Karl Brunner
- Phillip D. Cagan
- Tim Congdon
- Milton Friedman
- Alan Greenspan
- Steve Hanke
- David Laidler
- Allan H. Meltzer
- Anna Schwartz
- Margaret Thatcher
- Paul Volcker
- Clark Warburton

== See also ==
- Chicago school of economics
- Demurrage currency
- Fiscalism (usually contrasted to monetarism)
- Market monetarism
- Modern Monetary Theory
- Money creation - process in which private banks (primarily) or central banks (quantitative easing) create money
