= Clark Warburton =

American economist

Clark Warburton (27 January 1896, near Buffalo, New York – 18 September 1979, Fairfax, Virginia) was an American economist. He was described as the "first monetarist of the post-World War II period," the most uncompromising upholder of a strictly monetary theory of business fluctuations, and reviver of classic monetary-disequilibrium theory and the quantity theory of money.

== Life and works ==
Warburton received bachelor's and master's degrees from Cornell University after military service overseas during World War I. From the 1920s to the early 1930s, he held teaching positions in India and the United States. He received a Ph.D. degree at Columbia University in 1932. There his interest had shifted from history to economics while attending lectures of Wesley C. Mitchell. His dissertation was published as The Economic Results of Prohibition. From 1932 to 1934, he worked at the Brookings Institution. In 1934 he joined the newly formed Federal Deposit Insurance Corporation. He subsequently became chief economist there, retiring from that position in 1965. He continued to publish research on substantive and historical monetary economics thereafter.

In the period from 1945, Warburton was a critic of Keynesian theory when the latter was "crowding out interest in money." He made his case in a series of papers, most of them empirically oriented. He compiled and constructed quarterly data for the U.S. in the 1918–47 period, which showed that deviations in the money supply and bank reserves from trend preceded in the same direction business-cycle turning points of successively final output sold, output, prices, and the velocity of money. He extended such results to 1965 some 20 years later.

In examining longer periods of time (decades) for 1799–1939 and annual data from 1909 to 1947, he found that velocity adjusted for trend and production capacity was relatively stable in peace time, despite extreme monetary volatility and that changes in the quantity of money were the "overwhelmingly dominant factor" responsible for changes in the price level, consistent with the quantity theory of money.

These findings supported Warburton's contentions that:

- instability of the money supply was a major source of business fluctuations, including the Great Depression, not merely an intensifying factor
- stability of monetary policy was key to macroeconomic stability.

In 1966, a collection of 19 of his papers was published.

=== Warburton's Influence on Milton Friedman's Views on Money ===
In the early 1950s, Warburton exerted an important impact on the development of Milton Friedman's views on money. At that time Warburton sharply criticized Friedman's then-existing monetary framework. In this connection, Warburton convinced Friedman that the Federal Reserve had caused the Great Depression and that a money supply growth rate rule would have averted the Depression had the Federal Reserve followed such a rule. During the next decade Friedman became the leading advocate of the view that the Federal Reserve caused the Great Depression and he adopted a money supply growth rate rule as his main monetary policy platform.

== Selected publications ==
- 1932a, 1968. The Economic Results of Prohibition. AMS Press. Review.
- 1932b. "Prohibition and Economic Welfare," Annals of the American Academy of Political and Social Science, 163, Prohibition: A National Experiment, pp. 89–97.
- 1934. America's Capacity to Consume (with Maurice Leven and Harold G. Moulton), Brookings Institution.
- 1937. "Accounting Methodology in the Measurement of National Income," Studies in Income and Wealth, 1, Pt. 2, pp. 66–110.
- 1945b. "The Monetary Theory of Deficit Spending," Review of Economics and Statistics, 27(2), pp. 74–84.
- 1945d. "Monetary Policy in the United States in World War II," American Journal of Economics and Sociology, 4(3), pp. 375–83.
- 1948a. "Monetary Velocity and Monetary Policy," Review of Economics and Statistics, 30(4), pp. 304–14.
- 1949b. "Monetary Policy and Business Forecasting," Journal of Business, 22(2, 3), parts I and II, pp. 71–82, 178–87.
- 1950a. "Monetary Velocity and the Rate of Interest," Review of Economics and Statistics, 32(3), pp. 256–57.
- 1950b. "The Monetary Disequilibrium Hypothesis, The American Journal of Economics and Sociology, 10(1), pp. 1–11.
- 1950c. "Co-Ordination of Monetary, Bank Supervisory, and Loan Agencies of the Federal Government ," Journal of Finance, 5(2), pp. 148–69.
- 1952a. "A Hedge against Inflation," Political Science Quarterly, 67(1), pp. 1–17.
- 1952b "How Much Variation in the Quantity of Money Is Needed?" Southern Economic Journal, 18(4), pp. 495–509.
- 1953a "Money and Business Fluctuations in the Schumpeterian System," Journal of Political Economy, 61(6), pp. 509–22.
- 1953b "Rules and Implements for Monetary Policy," Journal of Finance, 8(1), pp. 1–21.
- 1958. "Variations in Economic Growth and Banking Developments in the United States From 1835 to 1885," Journal of Economic History, 18(3), pp. 283–97.
- 1965. "Maintaining Prosperity and Achieving Its Equitable Distribution," Southern Economic Journal, 31(4), pp. 289–97. Presidential address of the Southern Economic Association.
- 1981. "Monetary Disequilibrium Theory in the First Half of the Twentieth Century," History of Political Economy, 13(2), pp. 285–99.
