= Irving Fisher =

American economist (1867–1947)

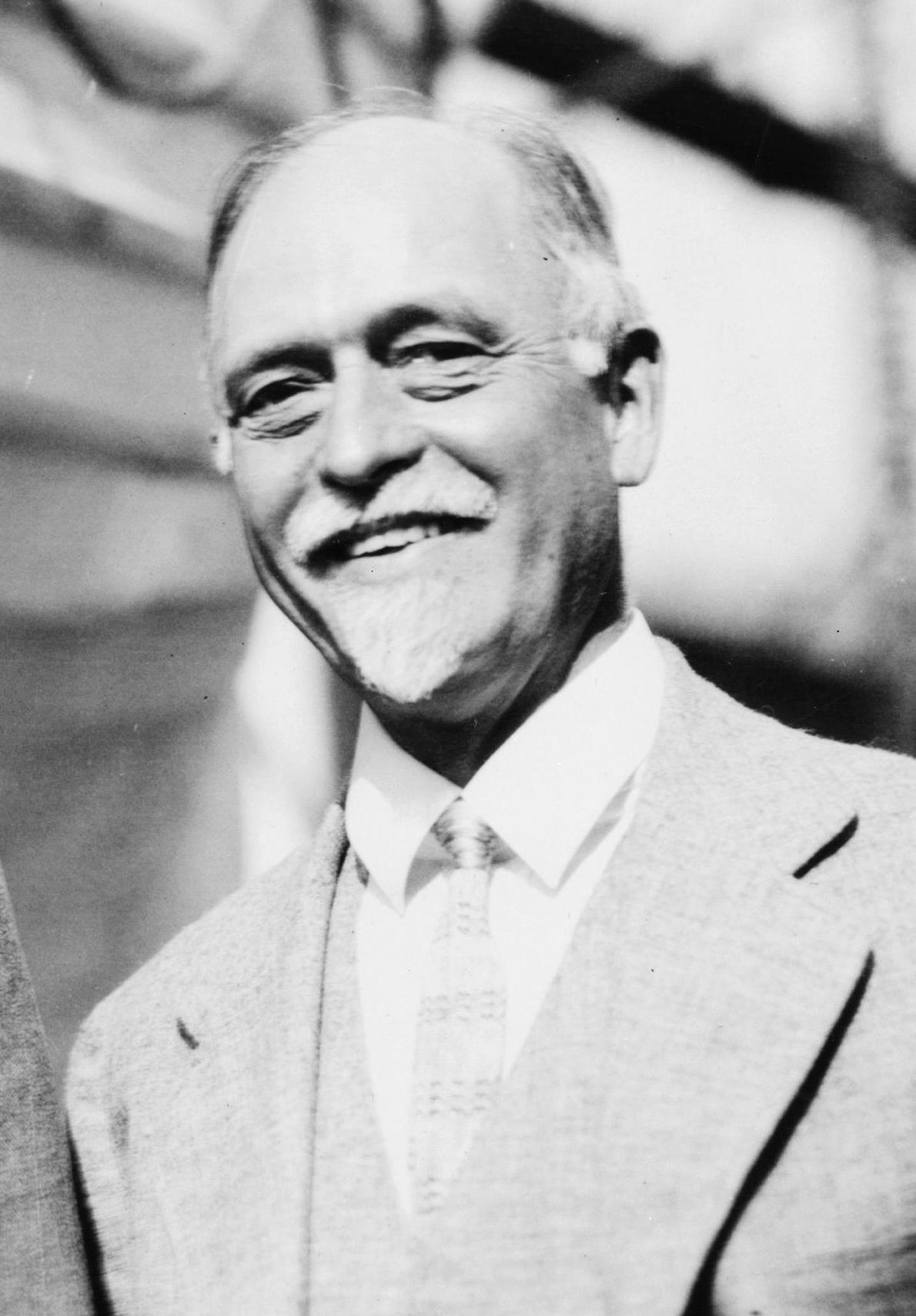
- Fisher in 1927
- Born: February 27, 1867; Saugerties, New York
- Died: April 29, 1947 (aged 80); New York City, New York
- Spouse: Margaret Hazard (m. 1893; died 1940)

Academic background
- Education: Yale University (BA, PhD)
- Doctoral advisor: Josiah Willard Gibbs; William Graham Sumner
- Influences: William Stanley Jevons, Eugen von Böhm-Bawerk

Academic work
- Discipline: Mathematical economics
- School or tradition: Neoclassical economics
- Institutions: Yale University
- Notable ideas: Fisher equation Equation of exchange Price index Debt deflation Phillips curve Money illusion Fisher separation theorem Independent Party of Connecticut

Irving Fisher (February 27, 1867 – April 29, 1947) was an American economist, statistician, inventor, eugenicist and progressive social campaigner. He was one of the earliest American neoclassical economists, though his later work on debt deflation has been embraced by the post-Keynesian school. Joseph Schumpeter described him as "the greatest economist the United States has ever produced", an assessment later repeated by James Tobin and Milton Friedman.

Fisher made important contributions to utility theory and general equilibrium. He was also a pioneer in the rigorous study of intertemporal choice in markets, which led him to develop a theory of capital and interest rates. His research on the quantity theory of money inaugurated the school of macroeconomic thought known as "monetarism". Fisher was also a pioneer of econometrics, including the development of index numbers. Some concepts named after him include the Fisher equation, the Fisher hypothesis, the international Fisher effect, the Fisher separation theorem and Fisher market.

Fisher was perhaps the first celebrity economist, but his reputation during his lifetime was irreparably harmed by his public statement, just nine days before the Wall Street Crash of 1929, that the stock market had reached "a permanently high plateau". His subsequent theory of debt deflation as an explanation of the Great Depression, as well as his advocacy of full-reserve banking and alternative currencies, were largely ignored in favor of the work of John Maynard Keynes. Fisher's reputation has since recovered in academic economics, particularly after his theoretical models were rediscovered in the late 1960s to the 1970s, a period of increasing reliance on mathematical models within the field. Interest in him has also grown in the public due to an increased interest in debt deflation after the Great Recession.

Fisher was one of the foremost proponents of the full-reserve banking, which he advocated as one of the authors of A Program for Monetary Reform where the general proposal is outlined.

== Biography ==
Fisher was born in Saugerties, New York. His father was a teacher and a Congregational minister, who raised his son to believe he must be a useful member of society. Despite being raised in religious family, he later on became an atheist. As a child, he had remarkable mathematical ability and a flair for invention. A week after he was admitted to Yale College his father died, at age 53. Irving then supported his mother, brother, and himself, mainly by tutoring. He graduated first in his class with a BA degree in 1888, having also been elected as a member of the Skull and Bones society.

In 1891, Fisher received the first PhD in economics granted by Yale. His faculty advisors were the theoretical physicist Willard Gibbs and the sociologist William Graham Sumner. As a student, Fisher had shown particular talent and inclination for mathematics, but he found that economics offered greater scope for his ambition and social concerns. His thesis, published by Yale in 1892 as Mathematical Investigations in the Theory of Value and Prices, was a rigorous development of the theory of general equilibrium. He based his mathematical theory on analogies with classical mechanics, providing a concordance table between mechanics and economics and visual mechanistic models of the workings of economic markets. When he began writing the thesis, Fisher had not been aware that Léon Walras and his continental European disciples had already covered similar ground. Nonetheless, Fisher's work was a very significant contribution and was immediately recognized and praised as first-rate by such European masters as Francis Edgeworth.

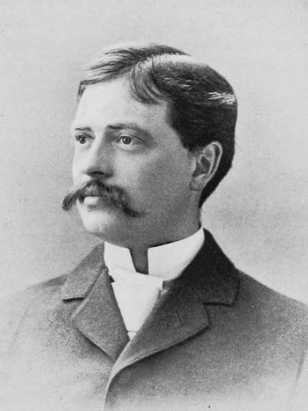
Fisher as a young professor (circa 1899)

After graduating from Yale, Fisher studied in Berlin and Paris. From 1890 onward, he remained at Yale, first as a tutor, then after 1898 as a professor of political economy, and after 1935 as professor emeritus. He edited the Yale Review from 1896 to 1910 and was active in many learned societies, institutes, and welfare organizations. He was elected to the American Academy of Arts and Sciences in 1912. He was president of the American Economic Association in 1918. He was elected to the American Philosophical Society in 1927. The American Mathematical Society selected him as its Gibbs Lecturer for 1929. A leading early proponent of econometrics, in 1930 he founded, with Ragnar Frisch and Charles F. Roos the Econometric Society, of which he was the first president.

Fisher was a prolific writer, producing journalism as well as technical books and articles, and addressing various social issues surrounding World War I, the prosperous 1920s and the depressed 1930s. He made several practical inventions, the most notable of which was an "index visible filing system" which he patented in 1913 and sold to Kardex Rand (later Remington Rand) in 1925. This, and his subsequent stock investments, made him a wealthy man until his personal finances were badly hit by the Crash of 1929.

Fisher was also an active social and health campaigner, as well as an advocate of vegetarianism, prohibition, and eugenics. In 1893, he married Margaret Hazard, a granddaughter of Rhode Island industrialist and social reformer Rowland G. Hazard. He died of inoperable colon cancer in New York City in 1947, at the age of 80.

== Economic theories ==
=== Utility theory ===
James Tobin, writing on the contributions of John Bates Clark and Irving Fisher to neoclassical theory in America argues that American economists contributed in their own way to the preparation of a common ground after the neoclassical revolution. In particular Clark and Irving Fisher "brought neoclassical theory into American journals, classrooms, and textbooks, and its analytical tools into the kits of researchers and practitioners." Already in his doctoral thesis, "Fisher expounds thoroughly the mathematics of utility functions and their maximization, and he is careful to allow for corner solutions." Already then, Fisher "states clearly that neither interpersonally comparable utility nor cardinal utility for each individual is necessary to the determination of equilibrium."

In reviewing the history of utility theory, economist George Stigler wrote that Fisher's doctoral thesis had been "brilliant" and stressed that it contained "the first careful examination of the measurability of the utility function and its relevance to demand theory." While his published work exhibited an unusual degree of mathematical sophistication for an economist of his day, Fisher always sought to bring his analysis to life and to present his theories as lucidly as possible. For instance, to complement the arguments in his doctoral thesis, he built an elaborate hydraulic machine with pumps and levers, allowing him to demonstrate visually how the equilibrium prices in the market adjusted in response to changes in supply or demand.

=== Interest and capital ===
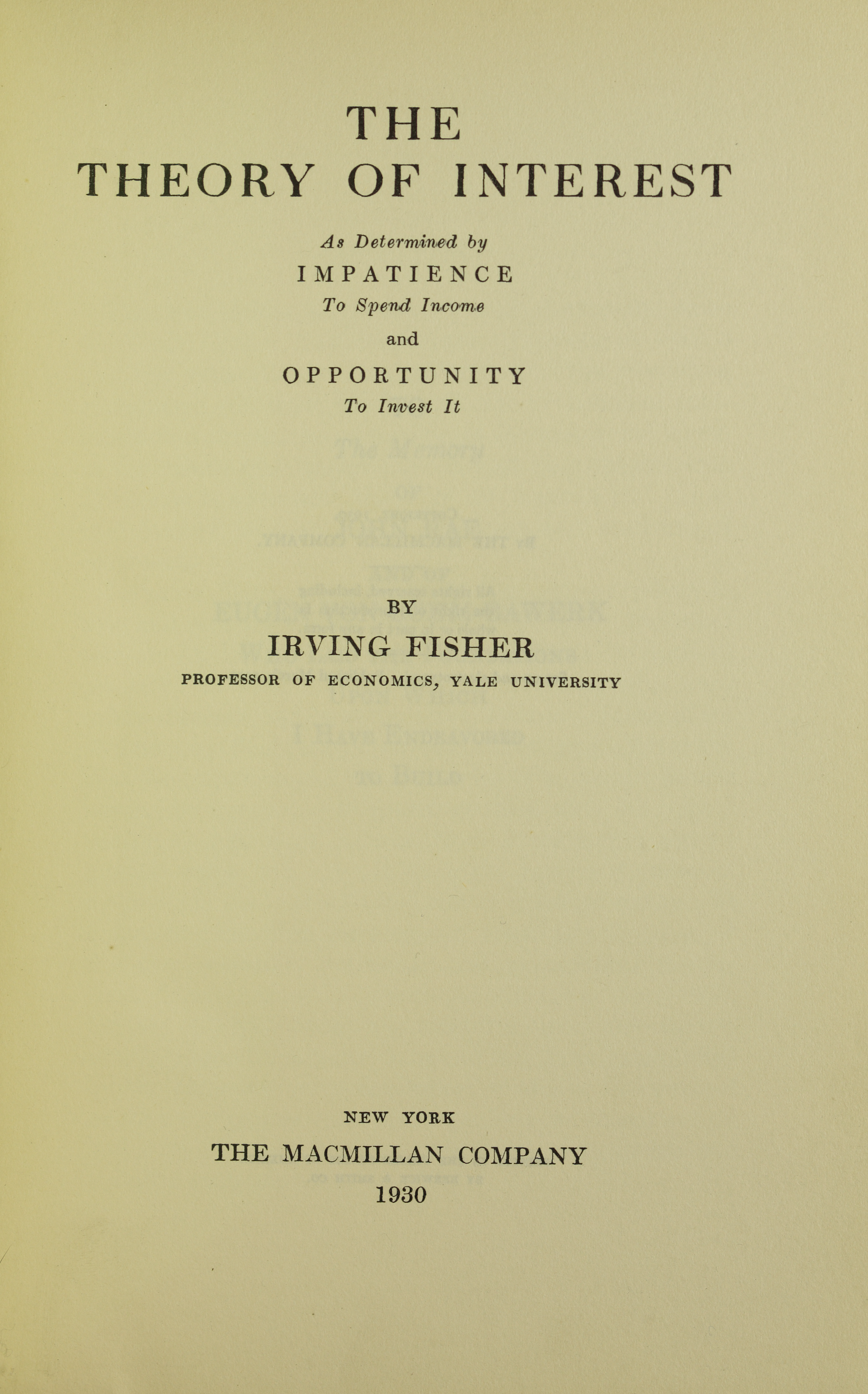
Theory of interest as determined by impatience to spend income and opportunity to invest it, 1930

Fisher is probably best remembered today in neoclassical economics for his theory of capital, investment, and interest rates, first exposited in his The Nature of Capital and Income (1906) and elaborated on in The Rate of Interest (1907). His 1930 treatise, The Theory of Interest, summed up a lifetime's research into capital, capital budgeting, credit markets, and the factors (including inflation) that determine interest rates.

Fisher saw that subjective economic value is not only a function of the amount of goods and services owned or exchanged, but also of the moment in time when they are purchased with money. A good available now has a different value than the same good available at a later date; value has a time as well as a quantity dimension. The relative price of goods available at a future date, in terms of goods sacrificed now, is measured by the interest rate. Fisher made free use of the standard diagrams used to teach undergraduate economics but labeled the axes "consumption now" and "consumption next period" (instead of the usual schematic alternatives of "apples" and "oranges"). The resulting theory, one of considerable power and insight, was presented in detail in The Theory of Interest.

This model, later generalized to the case of K goods and N periods (including the case of infinitely many periods) has become a standard theory of capital and interest, and is described in Gravelle and Rees, and Aliprantis, Brown, and Burkinshaw. This theoretical advance is explained in Hirshleifer.

Fisher saw that his theory, via economic policy, was making an impact on society as a whole. Once he brought out his Quantity Theory of Money, it started to bring economic models to life. One of the strongest points that Fisher brings out in discussing interest rates was the power of impatience.

=== Monetary economics ===
Fisher's research into the basic theory of prices and interest rates did not touch directly on the great social issues of the day. On the other hand, his monetary economics did and this grew to be the main focus of Fisher's mature work.

It was Fisher who (following the pioneering work of Simon Newcomb) formulated the quantity theory of money in terms of the "equation of exchange:" Let M be the total stock of money, P the price level, T the number of transactions carried out using money, and V the velocity of circulation of money, so that:

$M\cdot V = P\cdot T$

Later economists replaced T by the real output Y (or Q), usually quantified by the real Gross domestic product (GDP).

Fisher's Appreciation and Interest was an abstract analysis of the behavior of interest rates when the price level is changing. It emphasized the distinction between real and nominal interest rates:

$r=\frac{(1+i)}{(1+\pi)}-1 \simeq i - \pi$

where $r$ is the real interest rate, $i$ is the nominal interest rate, and the inflation $\pi$ is a measure of the increase in the price level. When inflation is sufficiently low, the real interest rate can be approximated as the nominal interest rate minus the expected inflation rate. The resulting equation is known as the Fisher equation in his honor.

Fisher believed that investors and savers – people in general – were afflicted in varying degrees by "money illusion"; they could not see past the money to the goods the money could buy. In an ideal world, changes in the price level would have no effect on production or employment. In the actual world with money illusion, inflation (and deflation) did serious harm. For more than forty years, Fisher elaborated his vision of the damaging "dance of the dollar" and devised various schemes to "stabilize" money, i.e. to stabilize the price level. He was one of the first to subject macroeconomic data, including the money stock, interest rates, and the price level, to statistical analyses and tests. In the 1920s, he introduced the technique later called distributed lags. In 1973, the Journal of Political Economy posthumously reprinted his 1926 paper on the statistical relation between unemployment and inflation, retitling it as "I discovered the Phillips curve". Index numbers played an important role in his monetary theory. Bert M. Balk called his book The Making of Index Numbers "still impressive" in 2012.

Fisher's main intellectual rival was the Swedish economist Knut Wicksell. Fisher espoused a more succinct explanation of the quantity theory of money, resting it almost exclusively on long run prices. Wicksell's theory was considerably more complicated, beginning with interest rates in a system of changes in the real economy. Although both economists concluded from their theories that at the heart of the business cycle (and economic crisis) was government monetary policy, their disagreement would not be solved in their lifetimes, and indeed, it was inherited by the policy debates between the Keynesians and monetarists beginning a half-century later.

=== Debt-deflation ===
Following the stock market crash of 1929, and in light of the ensuing Great Depression, Fisher developed a theory of economic crises called debt-deflation, which attributed the crises to the bursting of a credit bubble. Initially, during the upswing over-confident economic agents are lured by the prospect of high profits to increase their debt in order to leverage their gains. According to Fisher, once the credit bubble bursts, this unleashes a series of effects that have serious negative impact on the real economy:

1. Debt liquidation and distress selling.
2. Contraction of the money supply as bank loans are paid off.
3. A fall in the level of asset prices.
4. A still greater fall in the net worth of businesses, precipitating bankruptcies.
5. A fall in profits.
6. A reduction in output, in trade and in employment.
7. Pessimism and loss of confidence.
8. Hoarding of money.
9. A fall in nominal interest rates and a rise in deflation-adjusted interest rates.

Crucially, as debtors try to liquidate or pay off their nominal debt, the fall of prices caused by this defeats the very attempt to reduce the real burden of debt. Thus, while repayment reduces the amount of money owed, this does not happen fast enough since the real value of the dollar now rises ('swelling of the dollar').

This theory was largely ignored in favor of Keynesian economics, in part because of the damage to Fisher's reputation caused by his public optimism about the stock market, just prior to the crash. Debt-deflation has experienced a revival of mainstream interest since the 1980s, and particularly with the Late-2000s recession. Steve Keen predicted the 2008 recession by using Hyman Minsky's further development of Fisher's work on debt-deflation. Debt-deflation is now the major theory with which Fisher's name is associated.

== Stock market crash of 1929 ==
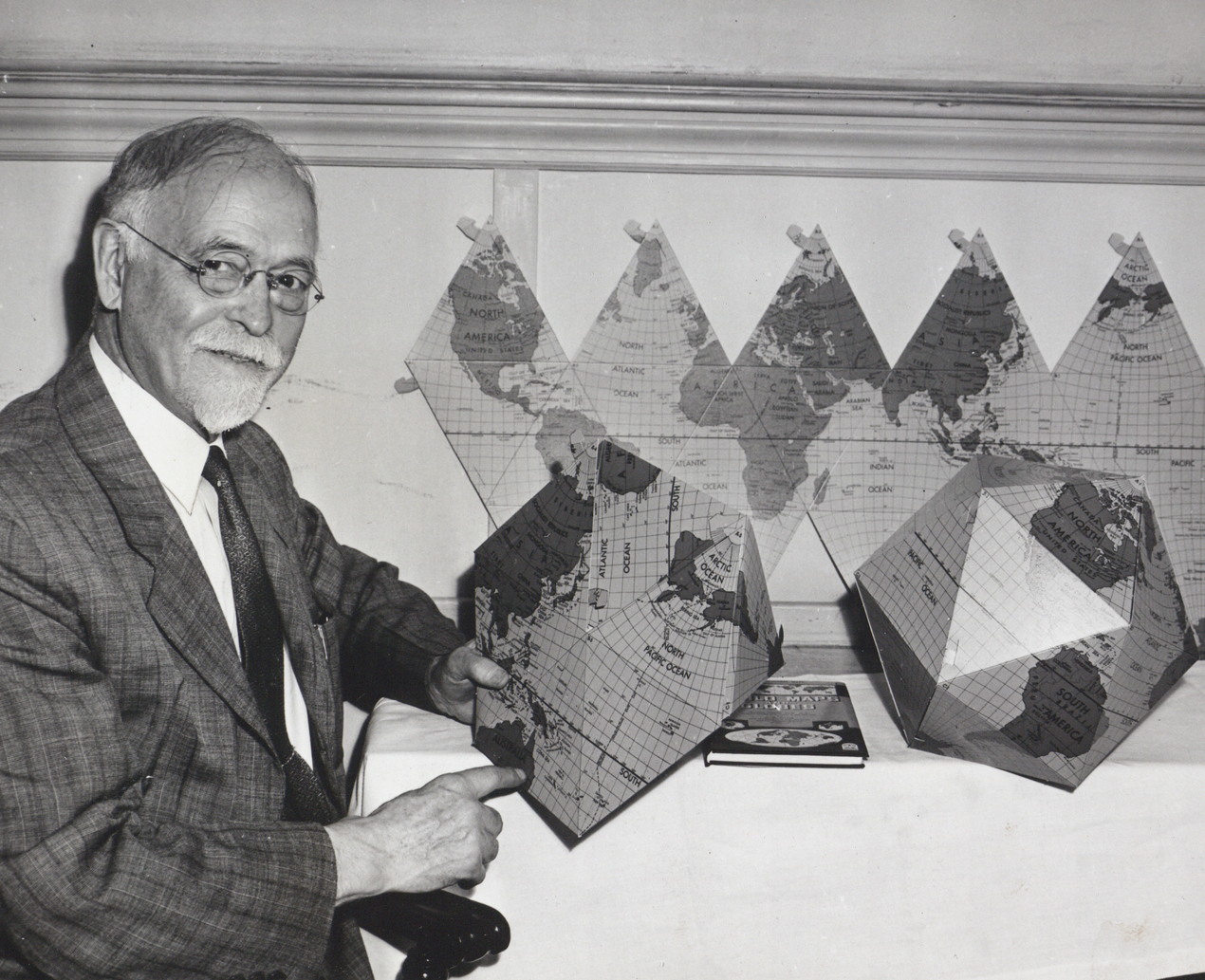
Irving Fisher and his map that can be folded into a globe,1944

The stock market crash of 1929 and the subsequent Great Depression cost Fisher much of his personal wealth and academic reputation. On October 15, 1929 he famously predicted, nine days before the crash, that stock prices had "reached what looks like a permanently high plateau." Irving Fisher stated on October 21 that the market was "only shaking out of the lunatic fringe" and went on to explain why he felt the prices still had not caught up with their real value and should go much higher. On Wednesday, October 23, he announced in a banker's meeting "security values in most instances were not inflated." For months after the Crash, he continued to assure investors that a recovery was just around the corner. Once the Great Depression was in full force, he did warn that the ongoing drastic deflation was the cause of the disastrous cascading insolvencies then plaguing the American economy because deflation increased the real value of debts fixed in dollar terms. Fisher was so discredited by his 1929 pronouncements and by the failure of a firm he had started that few people took notice of his "debt-deflation" analysis of the Depression. People instead eagerly turned to the ideas of Keynes. Fisher's debt-deflation scenario has since seen a revival since the 1980s.

== Constructive Income Taxation ==
Lawrence Lokken, the University of Miami School of Law professor of economics, credits Fisher's 1942 book with the concept behind the Unlimited Savings Accumulation Tax, a reform introduced in the United States Senate in 1995 by Senator Pete Domenici (R-New Mexico), former Senator Sam Nunn (D-Georgia), and Senator Bob Kerrey (D-Nebraska). The concept was that unnecessary spending (which is hard to define in a law) can be taxed by taxing income minus all net investments and savings, and minus an allowance for essential purchases, thus making funds available for investment.

== Social and health campaigns ==
In 1898, Fisher was diagnosed with tuberculosis, the same disease that had killed his father. He spent three years in sanatoria, finally making a full recovery. That experience sparked in him a vocation as a health campaigner. He was one of the founders of the Life Extension Institute, under whose auspices he co-authored the bestselling book How to Live: Rules for Healthful Living Based on Modern Science, published in 1915. He advocated regular exercise and the avoidance of red meat, tobacco, and alcohol. In 1924, Fisher wrote an anti-smoking article for the Reader's Digest, which argued that "tobacco lowers the whole tone of the body and decreases its vital power and resistance ... [it] acts like a narcotic poison, like opium and like alcohol, though usually in a less degree".

Fisher supported the legal prohibition of alcohol and wrote three booklets defending prohibition in the United States on grounds of public health and economic productivity. As a proponent of Eugenics he helped found the Race Betterment Foundation in 1906. He also defended eugenics, serving in the scientific advisory board of the Eugenics Record Office and as first president of the American Eugenics Society.

When his daughter Margaret was diagnosed with schizophrenia, Fisher had her treated at the New Jersey State Hospital at Trenton, whose director was the psychiatrist Henry Cotton. Cotton believed in a "focal sepsis" theory, according to which mental illness resulted from infectious material in the roots of teeth, bowel recesses, and other places in the body. Cotton also claimed that surgical removal of the infected tissue could alleviate the patient's mental disorder. At Trenton, Margaret Fisher had sections of her bowel and colon removed, which eventually resulted in her death. Irving Fisher nonetheless remained convinced of the validity of Cotton's treatment.

== Selected publications ==
Fisher, Irving Norton, 1961. A Bibliography of the Writings of Irving Fisher (1961). Compiled by Fisher's son; contains 2425 entries.

- Primary
  - 1892. Mathematical Investigations in the Theory of Value and Prices. Scroll to chapter links.
  - 1896. Appreciation and Interest. Link.
  - 1906. The Nature of Capital and Income. Scroll to chapter links.
  - 1907. The Rate of Interest. Extracts from Preface and Appendix to ch. VII.
  - 1910, 1914. Introduction to Economic Science. Section links.
  - 1911a, 1922, 2nd ed. The Purchasing Power of Money: Its Determination and Relation to Credit, Interest, and Crises. Scroll to chapter links from Library of Economics and Liberty (LE&L). Full text of 1920 edition online via FRASER
  - 1911b, 1913. Elementary Principles of Economics. Scroll to chapter links.
  - 1915. How to Live: Rules for Healthful Living Based on Modern Science (with Eugene Lyon Fisk). Link.
  - 1918, "Is 'Utility' the Most Suitable Term for the Concept It is Used to Denote?" American Economic Review, pp. 335–37]. Reprint.
  - 1921a. "Dollar Stabilization," Encyclopædia Britannica 12th ed.. XXX, pp. 852–53. Reprint page links from LE&L.
  - 1921b, The Best Form of Index Number, American Statistical Association Quarterly. 17(133), pp. 533–37.
  - 1922. The Making of Index Numbers: A Study of Their Varieties, Tests, and Reliability. Scroll to chapter links,
  - 1923, "The Business Cycle Largely a 'Dance of the Dollar'," Journal of the American Statistical Association, 18, pp. 1024–28. Link.
  - 1926, "A Statistical Relation between Unemployment and Price Changes," International Labour Review, 13(6), p pp. 785–92. Reprinted as 1973, "I Discovered the Phillips Curve: A Statistical Relation between Unemployment and Price Changes'," Journal of Political Economy, 81(2, Part 1), pp. 496–502.
  - 1927, "A Statistical Method for Measuring 'Marginal Utility' and Testing the Justice of a Progressive Income Tax" in Economic Essays Contributed in Honor of John Bates Clark .
  - 1928, The Money Illusion, New York: Adelphi Company. Scroll to chapter-preview links.
  - 1930a. The Stock Market Crash and After.
  - 1930b. The Theory of Interest: As Determined by Impatience to Spend Income and Opportunity to Invest It. New York: Macmillan Company. 1930 – via Internet Archive.. Chapter links, each numbered by paragraph via LE&L.
  - 1932. Booms and Depressions: Some First Principles. full text online via FRASER.
  - Fisher, Irving (1933a). "The debt-deflation theory of great depressions". Econometrica. 1 (4): 337–57. doi:10.2307/1907327. JSTOR 1907327 – via FRASER.
  - 1933b. Stamp Scrip. full text online
  - 1935. 100% Money. full text online
  - 1942. "Constructive Income Taxation: A Proposal for Reform." New York: Harper & Brothers.
  - 1996. The Works of Irving Fisher. edited by William J. Barber et al. 14 volumes London : Pickering & Chatto.

== See also ==
- Chicago plan
- Eugenics in the United States
- Ham and Eggs Movement, California pension reform plan, 1938–40
- Library of Economics and Liberty
- Marginalism
- Milton Friedman
- 2018 Swiss sovereign-money initiative
