= Hyperinflation in Indonesia =

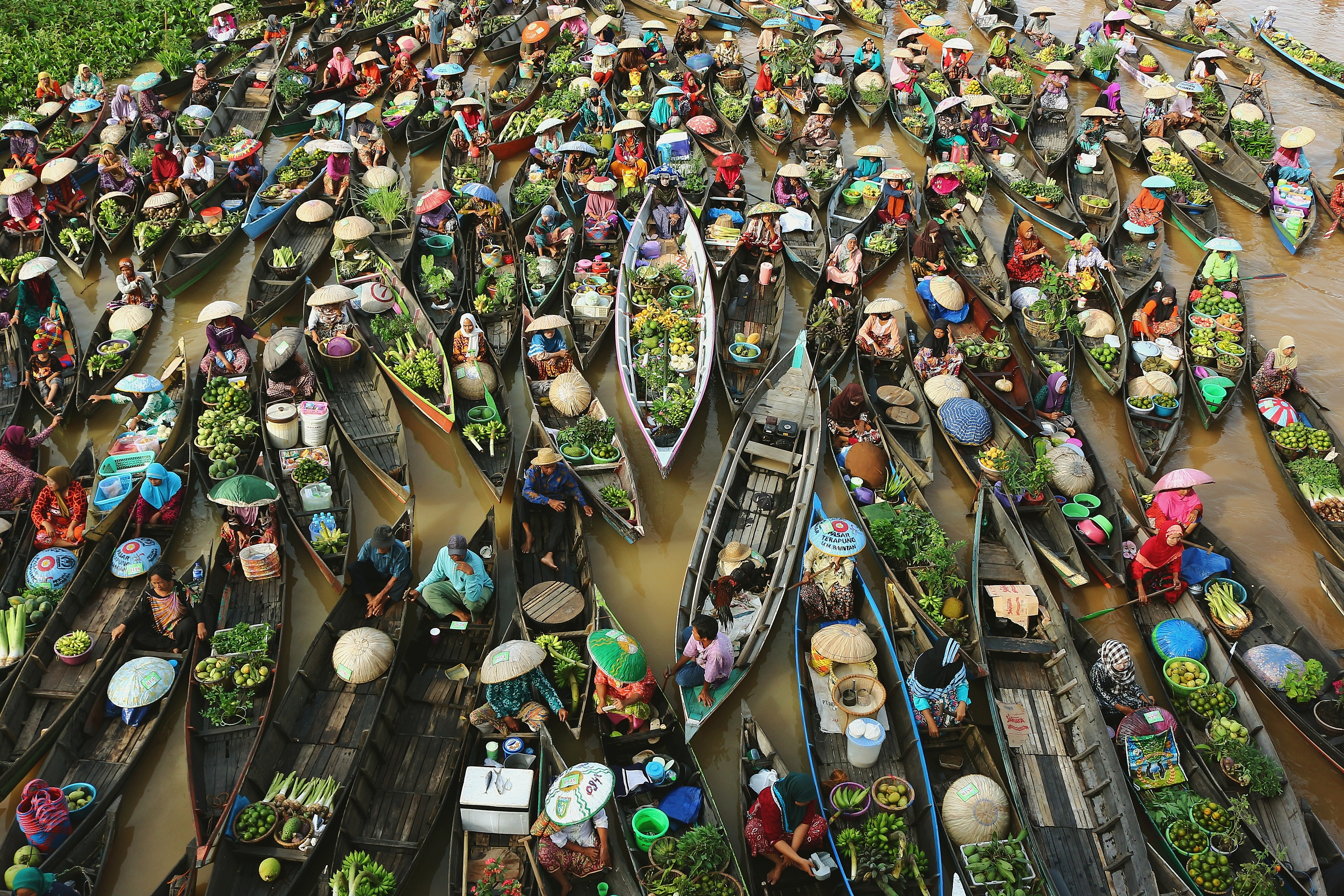
- Floating market in the village of Lok Baintan near Banjarmasin, South Kalimantan, Indonesia
- Date: 1960
- Cause: Rapid depreciation of the rupiah, significant increase in food costs, large budget deficit, excessive money issuance by the central bank, disruptions in production and imports, political and social instability, economic speculation, international economic crises, erosion of consumer and investor confidence

By the mid-1960s, Indonesia was experiencing political and economic instability. The newly independent nation faced internal divisions among the army, nationalists, Muslims, and communists after winning independence in 1945 (and the conclusion of the conflicts with the Dutch in 1949). President Sukarno attempted to balance these competing groups throughout the 1950s and early 1960s. By the middle of the 1960s, his ability to maintain political stability had deteriorated. Indonesia entered a period of serious economic crisis characterized by social unrest and hyperinflation.

By 1966, annual inflation had reached extremely high levels, widely described as hyperinflation, as unchecked money printing and fiscal mismanagement resulted from Sukarno's Guided Economy. Sukarno's authority weakened amid political and economic turmoil, leading to transfer of power to general Suharto in 1966, and Suharto's "New Order" regime took control amid political unrest and economic upheaval. By the late 1960s, the International Monetary Fund (IMF), had significantly lowered inflation and maintained financial stability.

== Background ==
=== Post-independence economy (1945–1959) ===
After gaining independence in 1945, Indonesia faced challenges in rebuilding its economy. Years of colonial exploitation, the Japanese occupation, and the subsequent revolution had left infrastructure, including transportation, communication, and administrative systems, damaged or underdeveloped. The country experienced shortages of skilled labor, limited industrial capacity, and dependence on primary exports such as rubber and tin. Agricultural production often did not meet domestic needs, contributing to recurring supply difficulties.

Economic policy during the 1950s emphasized state intervention, with the government seeking to reduce dependence on foreign trade and to promote domestic industries. Efforts to finance reconstruction and development were constrained by fiscal limitations, contributing to persistent budget deficits and inflationary pressures. These conditions resulted in a fragile economic environment that persisted into the early 1960s.

=== Guided Economy under Sukarno (1959–1965) ===
The Guided Economy was introduced in the late 1950s as part of President Sukarno's Guided Democracy framework, which emphasized state direction of economic activity. After the nationalization of Dutch enterprises beginning in 1957, the government assumed control over major industries and the banking sector. Many nationalized firms operated under close state direction, which affected managerial autonomy and administrative efficiency.

Institutional reforms under Guided Democracy expanded centralized planning bodies that coordinated economic policy. Fiscal and monetary pressures increased as government spending expanded during the Guided Economy period. Budget deficits were frequently financed through central bank credit, contributing to monetary expansion and rising inflation.

Between 1962 and 1965, economic policymaking involved competing priorities. Technocratic economists advocated stabilization measures, while nationalist and populist factions supported continued state-led expansion. These differences coincided with inconsistent policy responses during a period of declining export revenues and increasing external pressures. The period also saw the growth of rent-seeking practices linked to state control over assets, affecting institutional capacity. By the mid-1960s, these conditions were associated with rapid inflation and macroeconomic instability.

=== Inflationary trends before 1965 ===
In the early 1960s, Indonesia experienced rapidly rising inflation, which reflected persistent fiscal deficits and increased reliance on central bank credit. The government expanded the money supply to finance large budget shortfalls, while declining export revenues and shortages of foreign exchange limited the country’s ability to import essential goods, contributing to broader economic instability.

By 1962–1964, annual inflation rates in Jakarta were around 100 percent, reflecting the effects of large fiscal deficits and state-directed monetary expansion under Sukarno’s Guided Economy. Multiple exchange rates and price controls disrupted market operations, while public spending, particularly on infrastructure and political programs, remained high, reducing production efficiency and real wages.

Inflation escalated further in 1965, entering a phase of hyperinflation. The cost-of-living index in Jakarta rose to approximately 650%, while foreign-exchange reserves dropped sharply from US$326.4 million in 1960 to US$8.6 million in 1965. These developments reflected the cumulative effects of monetary financing of government deficits, loss of confidence in the currency, and structural weaknesses in fiscal and monetary policy.

== Causes of inflation ==
President Sukarno who applied Guided Democracy

This hyperinflation occurred in the context of political instability, declining economic output, and fiscal challenges under President Sukarno's Guided Democracy. This phenomenon reflects the limitations of the economic policies implemented and demonstrates how interactions between fiscal and monetary policies and external factors can contribute to a prolonged economic crisis. In general, such phenomena occur due to the financing and fiscal deficits through large-scale money creation, a loss of confidence in the national currency, supply shocks and exchange rate depreciation. These factors interacted in ways that contributed to rapid price increases.

=== Financing fiscal deficits by printing money ===
Bank Indonesia, the country's central bank, was responsible for printing money and also creating credit money. When government expenditures exceeded revenues, budget deficits occurred. To cover the shortfalls, the Indonesian government borrowed from Bank Indonesia and issued treasury bills as evidence of its debt obligations. As a result, Bank Indonesia printed a substantial amount of money, increasing the money supply in the economy and contributing to higher prices.

=== Loss of confidence in the national currency and high inflation expectations ===
Public confidence in the currency declined as inflation accelerated encouraging households to shift to more stable assets. When the public and investors lost confidence in the currency’s stability, they tended to convert their savings into tangible assets such as gold, capital goods, or foreign currencies. Expectations of continued price increases accelerated money circulation and reduced demand for the domestic currency, worsening the inflation rate.

=== Supply shock and exchange rate depreciation ===
Hyperinflation was further exacerbated by disruptions in production and trade. Shortages of goods, inefficiencies in production, and rising costs of imported raw materials resulting from the depreciation of the rupiah contributed to increasing domestic prices. This exchange rate depreciation increased the cost of imports, which in turn added to overall inflationary pressures.

== Hyperinflation rate ==
During the mid-1960s, Indonesia experienced a severe episode of hyperinflation under President Sukarno. The inflation rate rose from already high double-digit figures in the early 1960s to levels exceeding 600% in 1965 and around 1,500% in 1966.

The hyperinflation was largely attributed to uncontrolled money printing to finance large budget deficits, economic mismanagement, and political turmoil before the fall of Sukarno. By early 1966, the rupiah had lost most of its value, and consumer prices were increasing by more than 50% per month, meeting the standard definition of hyperinflation established by economist Phillip Cagan.

Following General Suharto’s rise to power in 1966, a drastic economic stabilization program supported by the IMF and Western governments was implemented. The program successfully reduced inflation to below 20% per year by 1969.

Annual inflation rate in Indonesia (1960–1970)
Year	Inflation (annual, %)	Source
1960	13.6	BPS
1961	26.0	BPS
1962	21.0	BPS
1963	31.0	BPS
1964	174.0	Bank Indonesia
1965	594.3	BPS
1966	1,136.0	IMF
1967	110.0	IMF
1968	85.0	IMF
1969	9.9	BPS
1970	3.9	BPS

The stabilization measures of 1966–1969 marked the end of Indonesia’s hyperinflationary crisis and laid the foundation for the country’s subsequent economic recovery during the early New Order era.

== Effect of hyperinflation ==
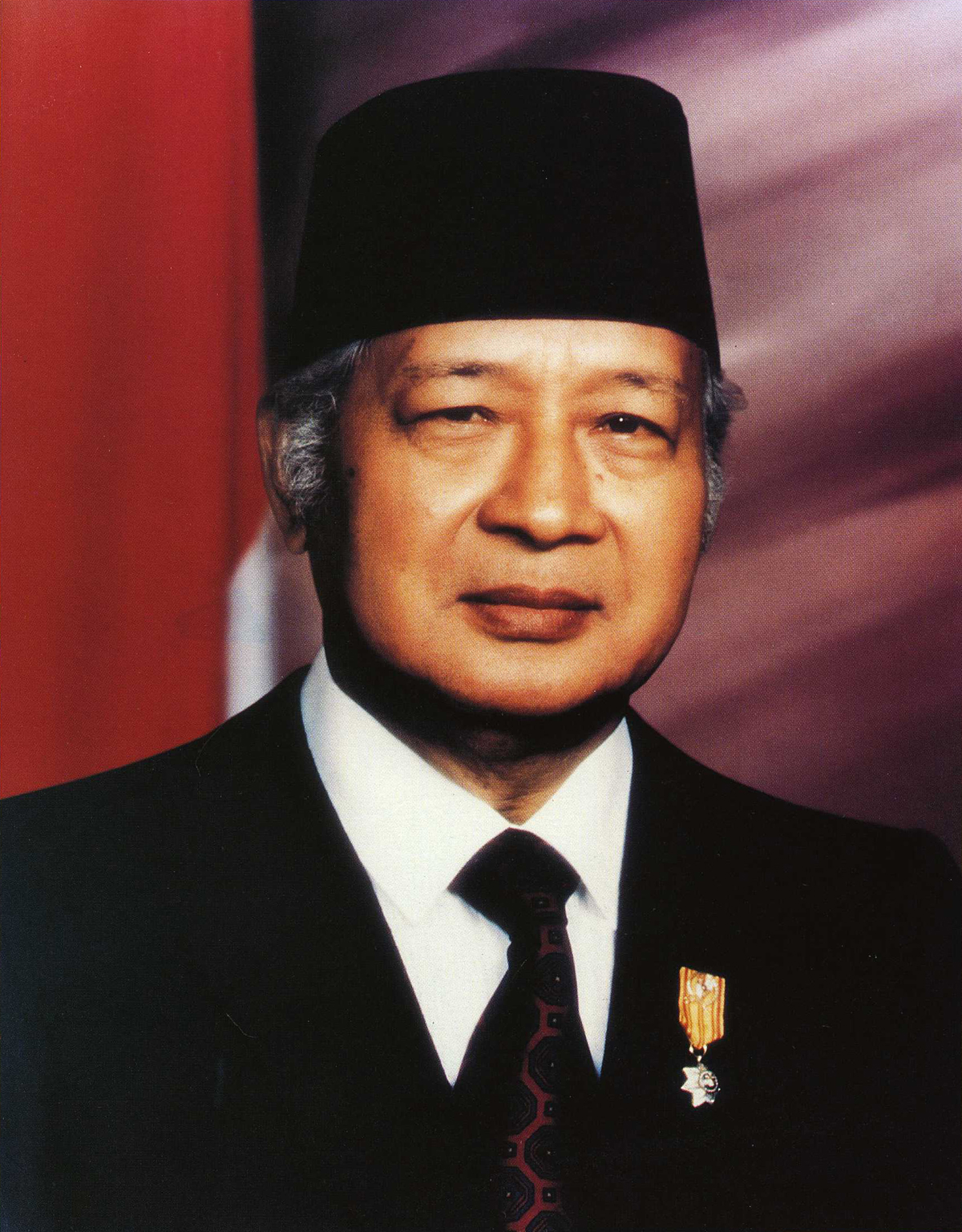
Suharto, Indonesian president from 1967 to 1998, established the New Order regime

Indonesian Hyperinflation exceeded 1000% in 1966, sharply reducing the real value of the rupiah. This period was characterized by a decline in real savings, significant losses in purchasing power, and disruptions in normal market activity. Rapid price changes made it difficult for businesses to set stable prices, contributing to shortages and irregular production. Investment levels fell substantially, with analysts attributing the decline to the difficulty of long-term planning in a highly unstable economic environment. High inflation hindered normal market transactions and contributed to disruptions in economic activity. Public confidence in the country's monetary and fiscal policy declined significantly.

The surge in prices disproportionately affected middle and lower-income groups, making essential goods increasingly difficult to afford. Wage growth did not keep pace with inflation, resulting in a rapid decline in real incomes. Hunger, poverty, and discontent spread throughout the country. The erosion of savings added to the economic hardship faced by many households. Inequalities widened, particularly between groups with access to foreign currency or gold and those without such resources. The worsening economic situation contributed to a broader perception of social and economic inequality. These conditions placed significant strain on social and economic structures.

Hyperinflation was one of the factors that weakened support for President Sukarno. The population lost confidence in the regime due to the economic crisis and challenges in managing the economy. This instability facilitated General Suharto's rise to power in 1967. The government faced criticism both for the inflation crisis and for its limited success in stabilizing the economy. The subsequent political transition involved extensive state repression and the introduction of liberal economic policies.

== Government response ==
During periods of hyperinflation, the Indonesian government focused on four main objectives: stabilizing inflation and the value of the rupiah, restoring confidence in the banking and financial sector, implementing structural reforms to prevent further economic losses, and addressing the social and economic disruptions caused by inflation. The government introduced measures including tighter monetary controls, fiscal discipline, and the restructuring of key state institutions. Indonesia sought international assistance and collaborated with global financial organizations to reinforce domestic reforms, secure stabilization funds, and rebuild economic credibility.

=== Role of International Monetary Fund (IMF) and the Indonesian Bank Restructuring Agency (IBRA) ===
Indonesia obtained support from the IMF, which provided emergency financial support and policy guidelines requiring reduced government spending, cuts to major subsidies such as fuel, and limits on public-sector wage increases to lower deficits and ease inflation. The IMF also directed Indonesia to reform its banking system by closing or restructuring insolvent banks, tightening supervision by Bank Indonesia, and improving financial transparency in state-owned enterprises. These measures helped stabilize the rupiah and gradually reduce inflation, though they also caused short-term hardships, including higher prices and increased unemployment.

The government established the Indonesian Bank Restructuring Agency (IBRA) to manage failing financial institutions and restore confidence in the banking sector. IBRA took responsibility for handling non-performing loans, recapitalizing struggling banks, and liquidating insolvent institutions to maintain financial stability, help prevent the total collapse of the banking system during the Asian Financial Crisis. The reforms introduced during this period laid the foundation for long-term improvements in banking regulation and financial governance.

Indonesia had previously experienced hyperinflation during the 1960s, with inflation exceeding 600% by 1966 as a result of government spending, political instability, and rapid money creation. A currency reform in late 1965 introduced a new rupiah at a rate of 1 new rupiah for every 1,000 old rupiah, aiming to simplify transactions and restore public confidence. The reform had limited results, as budget deficits financed through central bank credit continued, and inflationary pressures persisted.

=== Politicians and political tension ===
Following the transition from Sukarno to Suharto in 1966, the new administration implemented stricter fiscal and monetary policies, ending the practice of printing money to cover deficits and reducing public expenditure. Supported by the International Monetary Fund (IMF) and several Western nations, Indonesia launched an economic stabilization program focused on balancing the national budget, controlling credit, and attracting foreign aid.

Indonesia renegotiated its foreign debts and used foreign aid to finance essential imports and development projects. The government also reformed the foreign exchange system by introducing more flexible exchange rates and reducing administrative restrictions. Inflation fell from over 600% in 1966 to less than 20% by 1969. Additional measures included quarterly budget monitoring, reduction of non-essential expenditures, and improved tax collection on imports, sales, and petroleum products. Bank credit was directed mainly to sectors such as agriculture, industry, and distribution of basic goods, stimulating economic activity while maintaining price stability.

== See also ==
- Nationalization of Dutch
- New Order (Indonesia)
- Economy of Indonesia
