= Equation of exchange =

Equation used on monetary theory

In monetary economics, the equation of exchange is the relation:

$$M\cdot V = P\cdot Q$$

where, for a given period,

- $M\,$ is the total money supply in circulation on average in an economy.
- $V\,$ is the velocity of money, that is the average frequency with which a unit of money is spent.
- $P\,$ is the price level.
- $Q\,$ is an index of real expenditures (on newly produced goods and services).

The equation of exchange is a rearrangement of the definition of velocity. Velocity, or the average frequency with which money is spent, can be calculated as the ratio between the total amount of money spent, $PQ$, and the total amount of money that exists, $M$. Hence, $V := \frac{PQ}{M}$. Multiplying both sides of the definition of velocity by $M$ gives the equation of exchange. As such, without the introduction of any assumptions, it is an identity.

Economists also refer to the equation of exchange as the quantity equation. The quantity equation should not be confused with the quantity theory of money. An economic theory such as the quantity theory of money builds on the quantity equation by adding assumptions about the money supply, the price level, and the effect of interest rates on velocity to create a theory about the causes of inflation and the effects of monetary policy. Although the assumptions underlying the quantity theory or money may be contested, the quantity equation itself, aka the equation of exchange, is not.

In earlier analysis before the wide availability of the national income and product accounts, the equation of exchange was more frequently expressed in transactions form:

$$M\cdot V_T = P\cdot T$$

where

- $V_T\,$ is the transactions velocity of money, that is the average frequency across all transactions with which a unit of money is spent (including not just expenditures on newly produced goods and services, but also purchases of used goods, financial transactions involving money, etc.).
- $T\,$ is an index of the real value of aggregate transactions.

== Foundation ==
The foundation of the equation of exchange is the more complex relation:

$$M\cdot V_T =\sum_{i} (p_i\cdot q_i)=\mathbf{p}^\mathrm{T}\cdot\mathbf{q}$$

where:

- $p_i\,$ and $q_i\,$ are the respective price and quantity of the i-th transaction.
- $\mathbf{p^{T}}$ is a row vector of the $p_i\,$.
- $\mathbf{q}$ is a column vector of the $q_i\,$.

The equation:

$$M\cdot V_T = P\cdot T$$

is based upon the presumption of the classical dichotomy — that there is a relatively clean distinction between overall increases or decreases in prices and underlying, “real” economic variables — and that this distinction may be captured in terms of price indices, so that inflationary or deflationary components of p may be extracted as the multiplier P, which is the aggregate price level:

$$M\cdot V_T = P\cdot (\mathbf{p}_{real}^\mathrm{T}\cdot\mathbf{q}) = P\cdot T$$

where $\mathbf{p}_{real}^\mathrm{T}$ is a row vector of relative prices; and likewise for

$$M\cdot V = P\cdot Q.$$

In 2008 economist Andrew Naganoff (Russian: Эндрю Наганов) proposed an integral form of the equation of exchange, where on the left side of the equation is $M(V)dV$ under the integral sign, and on the right side is a sum $PiQi$ from i=1 to $N$. Generally, $N$ could be infinite. There are two variants of this formula:

$\int\ M(V)dV$ = $\sum\limits_{i = 1}^N {k_i \mathbf{P}_i \mathbf{Q}_i}$

and

$\int\limits^{b}_{a}M(V)dV \leqslant\sum\limits_{i = 1}^N {k_i \mathbf{P}_i \mathbf{Q}_i}$

The simplest cases for the dissipative scaling factors and $\mathbf{P}_i \mathbf{Q}_i$ are: $k_i = \pm 1$, $\mathbf{P}_i \mathbf{Q}_i = const$.

Also, $k_i$ can be determined by the methods of the fuzzy sets.

If liquidity function $W'(V) = M(V)$, then, by the mean value theorem:

$\int\limits^{V_{max}}_{0} M(V)dV$ = $M(V_m)V_{max} = W(V_{max}) - W(0)$

Naganoff's formula is used to describe in details the processes of inflation and deflation, Internet trading and cryptocurrencies.

== Applications ==
=== Quantity theory of money ===
The quantity theory of money is most often expressed and explained in mainstream economics by reference to the equation of exchange. For example, a rudimentary theory could begin with the rearrangement

$$P=\frac{M\cdot V}{Q}$$

If $V$ and $Q$ were constant or growing at the same fixed rate as each other, then:

$$\frac{d P}{P}= \frac{d M}{M}$$

and thus

$$\frac{d P/P}{d t}=\frac{d M/M}{d t}$$

where $t\,$ is time. That is to say that, if $V$ and $Q$ were constant or growing at equal fixed rates, then the inflation rate would exactly equal the growth rate of the money supply.

An opponent of the quantity theory would not be bound to reject the equation of exchange, but could instead postulate offsetting responses (direct or indirect) of $Q$ or of $V$ to $\frac{d M/M}{d t}$.

=== Money demand ===
Economists Alfred Marshall, A.C. Pigou, and John Maynard Keynes, associated with Cambridge University, focusing on money demand instead of money supply, argued that a certain portion of the money supply will not be used for transactions, but instead it will be held for the convenience and security of having cash on hand. This proportion of cash is commonly represented as $k$, a portion of nominal income ($nY$). (The Cambridge economists also thought wealth would play a role, but wealth is often omitted for simplicity.) The Cambridge equation for demand for cash balances is thus:

$$M_{D}=k\cdot nY$$

which, given the classical dichotomy and that real income must equal expenditures $Q$, is equivalent to

$$M_{D}=k\cdot P\cdot Q$$

Assuming that the economy is at equilibrium ($M_{D} = M$), that real income is exogenous, and that k is fixed in the short run, the Cambridge equation is equivalent to the equation of exchange with velocity equal to the inverse of k:

$$M\cdot\frac{1}{k} = P\cdot Q$$

The money demand function is often conceptualized in terms of a liquidity function, $L(r,Y)$,

$$M_D=P\cdot L(r,Y)$$

where $Y$ is real income and $r$ is the real rate of interest. If $V$ is taken to be a function of $r$, then in equilibrium

$$L(r,Q)=\frac{Q}{V(r)}$$

=== Valuation of unconventional money ===
The equation of exchange has been used to derive the value of means of payment that are not used as units of account, such as cryptocurrencies. The derivation relies on two assumptions.

Assumption 1. The number of cryptocurrency units required for any payment, $P$, depends only on the dollar amount that must be paid, $P^{$}$, and the latest cryptocurrency price, $S^{$/\text{coin}}$, so that
$$P = P^{$}/S^{$/\text{coin}}.$$

Assumption 2. The cryptocurrency is used at least for some payments, implying $PT = MV > 0$.

Let the total number of units that exist, $M$, be divided into those not used for payments, $Z$, and those used for payments, $M - Z$. By definition, units not used for payments have a zero velocity. Denoting the velocity of units used for payments by $V^{*}$, it follows that
$$MV = (M - Z) V^{*} + Z \cdot 0 = (M - Z) V^{*}.$$

Substituting Assumption 1 and the above expression into the quantity equation yields
$$\frac{P^{$} T}{S^{$/\text{coin}}} = (M - Z) V^{*}.$$

Note that $T^{$} = P^{$} T$ is the total dollar value of payments made with the cryptocurrency. As a final step, one solves for the value of one cryptocurrency unit (which requires Assumption 2 to hold true), which yields the price equation
$$S^{$/\text{coin}} = \frac{T^{$}/V^{*}}{M - Z}.$$
The expression gives the price of a cryptocurrency as the ratio of the dollar value of transactional demand (dollar value of payments with the cryptocurrency divided by the velocity of units used for payments) to the number of units actually used for payments (total units minus those that are not used to make any payments).

Everything else equal, the price of a cryptocurrency increases in the transactional demand (higher $T^{$}/V^{*}$) and in the amount of speculative or investment holdings (higher $Z$). Also, everything else equal, the price of a cryptocurrency decreases in the number of units that exist (higher $M$).

== History ==
The equation of exchange was stated by John Stuart Mill who expanded on the ideas of David Hume. An early algebraic formulation comes from Simon Newcomb. The transaction version of the equation of exchange was popularized by Irving Fisher.

== See also ==
- Irving Fisher § Economic theories
