= Phillip D. Cagan =

American economist

Phillip Cagan
- Born: April 30, 1927; Seattle, Washington, U.S.
- Died: June 15, 2012 (aged 85); Palo Alto, California, U.S.

Academic background
- Education: University of California, Los Angeles (BA); University of Chicago (MA, PhD)
- Doctoral advisor: Milton Friedman

Academic work
- Discipline: Economist
- School or tradition: Chicago School of Economics
- Institutions: Columbia University (1966–95); Brown University (1959–66); University of Chicago (1955–58); NBER (1954–55)
- Notable ideas: Analysis of money Analysis of inflation
- Awards: Fellow, Econometric Society (1975)

Phillip David Cagan (April 30, 1927 – June 15, 2012) was an American scholar and author. He was Professor of Economics Emeritus at Columbia University.

== Biography ==
Born in Seattle, Washington, Cagan moved with his family to Southern California shortly thereafter. Cagan joined the U.S. Navy at age 17 and fought in World War II. After the war, Cagan decided to go to college, and earned his B.A. from UCLA in 1948. He received his M.A. in 1951, and his Ph.D. in Economics in 1954 from the University of Chicago.

After graduate school, Cagan joined the National Bureau of Economic Research (NBER) in New York City where he worked for two years. Then he re-entered academia, teaching at the University of Chicago for three years, and at Brown University for seven years. In 1966 he was hired by Columbia University, where he taught economics for nearly thirty years — save for fifteen months spent in Washington, D.C. on the staff of the Council of Economic Advisers (CEA).

During his time at Columbia, Cagan was also associated with the American Enterprise Institute (AEI) in Washington, D.C., writing on public policy issues.

Cagan lived in Palo Alto, California during his last years.

== Contributions to economic science ==
Cagan's research centered on monetary economics: the demand for money, the determinants of the money supply, the transmission of monetary policy, and the causes and control of inflation. Over his career he published more than 100 books, journal articles, reviews, reports and pamphlets on these and related topics in macroeconomics. He was closely identified with monetarism, the view that variations in the growth of the money stock are the principal source of inflation and of fluctuations in business activity.

=== Hyperinflation and the Cagan model ===
Cagan's best-known work is his doctoral dissertation, written under Milton Friedman at the University of Chicago and published as "The Monetary Dynamics of Hyperinflation", the lead essay in Friedman's edited volume Studies in the Quantity Theory of Money (1956). Cagan argued that during a hyperinflation the enormous movements in money and prices dwarf changes in real income and other real variables, so that monetary relationships can be studied almost in isolation from the real economy.

The study introduced a definition of hyperinflation that is still standard: an episode beginning in the month that the monthly rate of price increase first exceeds 50 percent and ending in the month before it falls below that rate and stays below it for at least a year. Applying it, Cagan examined seven of the eight hyperinflations that occurred between 1920 and 1946: Austria (1921–22), Russia (1921–24), Germany (1922–23), Poland (1923–24), Hungary (1923–24), Greece (1943–44) and Hungary (1945–46), the last being by far the most extreme of the seven.

To explain the behavior of real money balances in these episodes, Cagan specified a money demand function in which the logarithm of real balances depends only on the expected rate of inflation, and modeled expectations as adaptive, revised each period in proportion to the gap between actual and expected inflation. In practice this made expected inflation an exponentially weighted average of past inflation rates. He found that this simple relationship fit the data well, implying that the demand for money remained stable even under extreme monetary disorder—a result that lent empirical support to Friedman's restatement of the quantity theory of money. A contemporary review noted the essay's "extensive manipulation of differential equations and an ingenious use of exponentially weighted averages". Cagan found that "the parameters of money demand functions estimated during hyperinflation generally satisfy the condition of dynamic stability that precludes the inflation from being self-generating, or displaying period-to-period oscillations"; on this reading the hyperinflations were driven by sustained money creation rather than by self-reinforcing expectations. The essay is regarded as the most prominent early empirical application of adaptive expectations.

Cagan's framework also exposed what later became known as "Cagan's paradox". With a semi-logarithmic money demand function there is a rate of inflation that maximizes the government's real revenue from money creation (the seigniorage or inflation tax), producing a Laffer curve for seigniorage; yet in the hyperinflations he studied, actual inflation rates far exceeded his estimates of the revenue-maximizing rate. The paradox has been widely treated as a stylized fact of empirical macroeconomics, although some later work using data from many more episodes attributes it to the choice of functional form.

The essay was immediately recognized as a classic and has remained a staple of graduate reading lists in monetary economics for more than half a century. Much of the subsequent literature on hyperinflation took Cagan's model as its starting point, and it was re-examined or extended by a number of leading macroeconomists, notably "Barro (1970), Sargent and Wallace (1973), Frenkel (1975, 1976a, 1976b, 1977, 1979), Sargent (1977), Abel et al. (1979), Salemi (1979), and Salemi and Sargent (1979)".

Among these, Robert Barro (1970) related money demand to the length of the payments period; Thomas J. Sargent and Neil Wallace (1973) showed that, under certain conditions on the money supply process, Cagan's adaptive expectations were also rational; their model accounted for the pattern of Granger causality in Cagan's data, in which inflation helped predict money creation but not the reverse. Jacob A. Frenkel (1977) used forward exchange rates as a market measure of expected inflation in the German case; and Sargent (1977) and Michael Salemi and Sargent (1979) went on to derive consistent estimators of Cagan's money demand parameters under rational expectations. Mohsin Khan (1980) re-examined the model's dynamic stability, asking whether the money demand parameters estimated for the hyperinflations implied that inflation, once under way, could sustain itself through expectations alone or swing back and forth from month to month, and concluded that the estimates generally ruled out both kinds of instability. The framework was also applied to other episodes, such as the Chinese hyperinflation of 1945–1949, and later tested with cointegration methods.

Monetary economists continue to refer to the "Cagan money demand function" when modeling the real value of money, and the specification has even been used to estimate the demand for gold over 1561–1913. Cagan himself wrote the entry on hyperinflation for The New Palgrave: A Dictionary of Economics.

=== Determinants of the money stock ===
At the National Bureau of Economic Research (NBER), Cagan wrote Determinants and Effects of Changes in the Stock of Money, 1875–1960 (1965), which sought to identify the "causal relationships between changes in money, prices and output". It was a companion to Friedman and Schwartz's A Monetary History of the United States, 1867–1960 (1963) in the NBER's Studies in Business Cycles series, for which Friedman wrote the foreword. The book decomposed changes in the U.S. money stock into three "proximate determinants": high-powered money, the currency–money ratio (the share of money balances the public holds as currency rather than bank deposits), and the reserve ratio (the high-powered reserves banks hold per dollar of deposits). The money stock rises with an increase in high-powered money or a fall in either ratio, a framework closely related to the money multiplier.

Cagan found that roughly nine-tenths of the long-run growth of the money stock between 1875 and 1955 came from growth in high-powered money—driven largely by the gold stock under the gold standard and, after 1914, increasingly by the operations of the Federal Reserve—with the remainder coming from declines in the two ratios. Over business cycles, by contrast, the currency ratio was the largest single source of fluctuations in monetary growth, and banking panics, which sharply raised both the currency and reserve ratios, lay behind most of the severest monetary contractions. On the direction of causation, he concluded that over the long run money growth caused movements in prices rather than the reverse, while over the cycle influence ran in both directions, with monetary effects clearly important in severe depressions such as the Great Depression but less certain in mild cycles. Benjamin Klein praised its "careful empirical work" and called it "the most complete study in the area".

A related early study, "The Demand for Currency Relative to the Total Money Supply" (1958), published in the Journal of Political Economy, examined the long-run decline in the public's preference for currency over demand deposits and has been widely cited.

=== Monetary policy and interest rates ===
In The Channels of Monetary Effects on Interest Rates (1972), Cagan distinguished two traditional accounts of how money affects the economy—a credit theory, in which monetary effects work through the lending of banks and other financial intermediaries, and a quantity or portfolio theory, in which they work through the public's adjustment of its asset holdings. He tested them by regressing interest rates on the sources of monetary growth. His model implied that a faster rate of monetary growth first lowers interest rates and then lets them return toward their initial level, after which the Fisher effect of anticipated inflation pushes nominal rates higher. With Arthur Gandolfi he used this time pattern to estimate the lag in the effects of monetary policy.

With Anna J. Schwartz, Cagan examined whether the rapid growth of near-money substitutes had weakened the Federal Reserve's control of the economy, a claim that some economists had advanced by analogy with the Keynesian liquidity trap; their conclusions are collected in "Has the Growth of Money Substitutes Hindered Monetary Policy?" (1975) and "How Feasible Is a Flexible Monetary Policy?" He also wrote on the long-run neutrality of money, offered an assessment of the rational expectations movement, and examined whether the endogeneity of the money supply undermines the evidence that money affects economic activity. With William G. Dewald he edited a 1982 Journal of Money, Credit and Banking symposium on the conduct of U.S. monetary policy, to which he contributed a study of the choice among monetary aggregates as targets and guides for policy.

=== Saving and the financial effects of inflation ===
In an NBER study of household survey data, The Effect of Pension Plans on Aggregate Saving (1965), Cagan tested whether employer pension plans crowd out other personal saving. Contrary to the expectation that pension contributions would simply substitute for other saving, he found that covered households saved slightly more in other forms as well, which he called a "recognition effect": coverage made workers more aware of the need to provide for retirement.

With Robert E. Lipsey he wrote The Financial Effects of Inflation (1978), which compared the experience of U.S. financial markets after the mid-1960s with the standard theory of how an economy adjusts to inflation. The authors found that inflation had been highly unsettling for financial institutions: interest rates had risen and fluctuated widely, and common stocks had failed to provide the protection against inflation that the theory predicted.

=== Persistent inflation and public policy ===
Cagan took a 15-month leave from Columbia in 1969 to serve on the staff of the Council of Economic Advisers during the Nixon administration, and in the 1970s he wrote extensively on inflation policy for the American Enterprise Institute, contributing to volumes such as Economic Policy and Inflation in the Sixties (1972) and A New Look at Inflation: Economic Policy in the Early 1970s (1973), the latter assessing developments since the imposition of direct wage and price controls in August 1971.

His essays from 1968 to 1976 were collected in Persistent Inflation: Historical and Policy Essays (1979), which addressed the nature and causes of inflation, contrasted monetary and cost-push theories, traced the escalation of U.S. inflation from 1965 through the 1971 price controls, and analyzed the costs of reducing it. A recurring theme was that prices had become less responsive to recessions after the Second World War. In "The Reduction of Inflation by Slack Demand" (1978), Cagan argued that the procyclical swings of inflation masked a smaller and slower effect of economic slack on its underlying trend, so that lasting disinflation would require holding unemployment above its full-employment level for an extended period while demonstrating that restraint would persist over a full cycle. He judged the obstacle to be political rather than economic and doubted that wage-price controls could substitute for restraint of demand.

== Recognition ==
Cagan was elected a Fellow of the Econometric Society in 1975, and he chaired Columbia's Department of Economics for three years. He was at times mentioned as a possible candidate for the Nobel Memorial Prize in Economic Sciences, but was never selected for the award.

== Selected bibliography ==
- Cagan, Phillip (1956). "The Monetary Dynamics of Hyperinflation". In Friedman, Milton (ed.). Studies in the Quantity Theory of Money. Chicago: University of Chicago Press. ISBN 0-226-26406-8..
- ______, "Why Do We Use Money in Open Market Operations?" The Journal of Political Economy, Vol. 66, No. 1 (Feb., 1958), pp. 34–46.
- ______, "The Demand for Currency Relative to the Total Money Supply," The Journal of Political Economy, Vol. 66, No. 4 (Aug., 1958), pp. 303–328,
- ______, Determinants and Effects of Changes in the Stock of Money, 1875–1960, New York: Columbia University Press (1965).
- ______, "The Non-Neutrality of Money In the Long Run: A Discussion of the Critical Assumptions and Some Evidence," Journal of Money, Credit and Banking, Vol. 1, No. 2, Conference on Money and Economic Growth (May, 1969), pp. 207–227.
- ______, Persistent Inflation: Historical and Policy Essays, New York: Columbia University Press (1979).
- ______, "Reflections on Rational Expectations," Journal of Money, Credit and Banking, Vol. 12, No. 4, Part 2: Rational Expectations (Nov., 1980), pp. 826–832.
- ______, "The Choice Among Monetary Aggregates as Targets and Guides for Monetary Policy," Journal of Money, Credit and Banking, Vol. 14, No. 4, Part 2: The Conduct of U.S. Monetary Policy (Nov., 1982), pp. 661–686.
- ______, "Does Endogeneity of the Money Supply Disprove Monetary Effects on Economic Activity?" Journal of Macroeconomics, Vol. 15, (Summer 1993).
- Phillip Cagan and William G. Dewald, "The Conduct of U.S. Monetary Policy: Introduction," Journal of Money, Credit and Banking, Vol. 14, No. 4, Part 2: The Conduct of U.S. Monetary Policy (Nov., 1982), pp. 565–574.
- Phillip Cagan and Arthur Gandolfi, "The Lag in Monetary Policy as Implied by the Time Pattern of Monetary Effects on Interest Rates," The American Economic Review, Vol. 59, No. 2, Papers and Proceedings of the Eighty-first Annual Meeting of the American Economic Association (May, 1969), pp. 277–284
- Phillip Cagan and Anna J. Schwartz, "Has the Growth of Money Substitutes Hindered Monetary Policy?" Journal of Money, Credit and Banking, Vol. 7, No. 2 (May, 1975), pp. 137–159.
- ______, "The National Bank Note Puzzle Reinterpreted," Journal of Money, Credit and Banking, Vol. 23, No. 3, Part 1 (Aug., 1991), pp. 293–307.

== See also ==
- Monetarism
