= USA Tax =

1995 proposed law for tax reform in the United States

The USA Tax Act (H.R. 269), short for "Unlimited Savings Allowance", was a bill in the United States Congress for changing tax laws to replace the federal income taxes with a progressive consumption tax on households and a value-added tax on businesses . Lawrence Lokken credits Irving Fisher with the insight that consumption can be taxed by taxing income minus savings. See also a later version of Lokken's book. The first bill (S. 722) was introduced in the United States Senate in April 1995 by senators Sam Nunn (D-Ga.) and Pete Domenici (R-N.M.).
