= Quantity theory of money =

Theory in monetary economics

The quantity theory of money (QTM) is a hypothesis within monetary economics which states that the general price level of goods and services is directly proportional to the amount of money in circulation (i.e., the money supply), and that the causality runs from money to prices. This implies that the theory potentially explains inflation. It originated in the 16th century and has been proclaimed the oldest surviving theory in economics.

According to some, the theory was originally formulated by Renaissance mathematician Nicolaus Copernicus in 1517, whereas others mention Martín de Azpilcueta, a prominent member of the School of Salamanca, and Jean Bodin as independent originators of the theory. It has later been discussed and developed by several prominent thinkers and economists including John Locke, David Hume, Irving Fisher and Alfred Marshall. Milton Friedman made a restatement of the theory in 1956 and made it into a cornerstone of monetarist thinking.

The theory is often stated in terms of the equation MV = PY, where M is the money supply, V is the velocity of money, and PY is the nominal value of output or nominal GDP (P itself being a price index and Y the amount of real output). This equation is known as the quantity equation or the equation of exchange and is itself uncontroversial, as it can be seen as an accounting identity, residually defining velocity as the ratio of nominal output to the supply of money. Assuming additionally that Y is exogenous, being independently determined by other factors, that V is constant, and that M is exogenous and under the control of the central bank, the equation is turned into a theory which says that inflation (the change in P over time) can be controlled by setting the growth rate of M. However, all three assumptions are arguable and have been challenged over time. Output is generally believed to be affected by monetary policy at least temporarily, velocity has historically changed in unanticipated ways because of shifts in the money demand function, and some economists believe the money supply to be endogenously determined and hence not controlled by the monetary authorities. While it is called the Quantity Theory of Money, as James Tobin pointed out in his debate with Milton Friedman it should be called the Quantity Theory of Prices or Inflation, since it is a theory of the inflation rate, and not of the money growth rate.

The QTM played an important role in the monetary policy of the 1970s and 1980s when several leading central banks (including the Federal Reserve, the Bank of England and Bundesbank) based their policies on a money supply target in accordance with the theory. However, the results were not satisfactory, and strategies focusing specifically on monetary aggregates were generally abandoned during the 1980s and 1990s. Today, most major central banks in practice follow inflation targeting by suitably changing interest rates, and monetary aggregates play little role in monetary policy considerations in most countries.

== Origins and development ==
=== Before 1900: Early contributions ===
The "state savings" (國蓄 pinyin:guó xù) chapter of the Guanzi (a Chinese philosophical and political text compiled in the early Han dynasty which discusses concepts of political economy that evolved in the Spring and Autumn period) has been described as the first-ever exposition of the quantity theory of money.

Economic historian Mark Blaug has called the quantity theory of money "the oldest surviving theory in economics", its origins originating in the 16th century. Nicolaus Copernicus noted in 1517 that money usually depreciates in value when it is too abundant, which is by some historians taken as the first mention of the theory. Robert Dimand in the chapter on the history of monetary economics in The New Palgrave Dictionary of Economics identified Martín de Azpilcueta (1536) and Jean Bodin (1568) as the originators of a proper theory usable for explaining the observed quadrupling of prices during the phenomenon known as the Price Revolution following the influx of silver from the New World to Europe.

John Locke studied the velocity of circulation, and David Hume in 1752 used the quantity theory to develop his price–specie flow mechanism explaining balance of payments adjustments. Also Henry Thornton, John Stuart Mill and Simon Newcomb among others contributed to the development of the quantity theory.

During the 19th century, a main rival of the quantity theory was the real bills doctrine, which says that the issue of money does not raise prices, as long as the new money is issued in exchange for assets of sufficient value. According to proponents of the real bills doctrine, money supply responded passively in response to money demand. Consequently, there could be no causal influence from money to prices; conversely, the connection ran in the opposite direction: Money demand was determined by income and prices, which were affected by inflation, caused by various real (i.e., non-monetary) reasons.

=== 1900–1950: Fisher, Wicksell, Marshall and Keynes ===
The eminent economist Irving Fisher, building upon work by Newcomb, developed the theory further in what has been called "The Golden Age of the quantity theory", formalizing the equation of exchange and attempting to measure the velocity of money independently empirically. Fisher insisted on the long-run neutrality of money, but admitted that money was not neutral during transition periods of up to 10 years. Another renowned monetary economist, Knut Wicksell, criticized the quantity theory of money, citing the notion of a "pure credit economy". Wicksell instead emphasized real shocks as a cause of observed price movements and developed his theory of the natural rate of interest to explain why the monetary authority should stabilize by setting the interest rate rather than the quantity of money – a position that has received renewed attention during the 21st century, exemplified in the influential Taylor rule of monetary policy.

The extremely influential neoclassical economist Alfred Marshall, Professor at Cambridge, expounded the quantity theory in a version which stated that desired cash balances (i.e., money demand) was proportional to nominal income. The proposition is normally written M = kPY, where k is the proportionality factor. This is known as the Cambridge equation, a variant of the quantity theory. As the coefficient k is the reciprocal of V, the income velocity of circulation of money in the equation of exchange, the two versions of the quantity theory are formally equivalent, though the Cambridge variant focuses on money demand as an important element of the theory.

Marshall's disciple John Maynard Keynes extended his monetary analysis in several ways and eventually integrated it into his General Theory of Employment, Interest and Money, published in 1936, which formed the cornerstone of the Keynesian Revolution. Keynes accepted the quantity theory in principle as accurate over the long run, but not over the short run, coining in his 1923 book A Tract on Monetary Reform the famous sentence, "In the long run, we are all dead". He emphasized that money demand (or, in his terminology, liquidity preference) depended on the interest rate as well as nominal income, and contended that contrary to contemporaneous thinking, velocity and output were not stable, but highly variable and as such, the quantity of money was of little importance in driving prices. Rather, changes in the money supply could have effects on real variables like output.

At the same time, as Keynes personally, and his followers who contributed to the resulting theoretical foundation of Keynesian economics, in principle recognized a role for monetary policy in stabilizing economic fluctuations over the business cycle, in practice they believed that fiscal policy was more efficient for this purpose, maintaining that changes in interest rates had little effect on demand and output. The Keynesian paradigm came to dominate macroeconomic thinking until the 1970s, assigning little attention to monetary policy.

=== Monetarism ===
However, from the 1950s and increasingly during the 1960s, the Keynesian view was challenged by an initially small, but increasingly influential minority, the monetarists, the intellectual leader of which was Milton Friedman. In response to the Keynesian view of the world, he made a restatement of the quantity theory in 1956 and used it as a cornerstone for monetarist thinking.

Friedman agreed that money could affect output in the short run. Indeed, he believed that monetary policy was much more powerful in this respect than fiscal policy. Together with Anna Schwartz, he wrote in 1963 the influential book A Monetary History of the United States, concluding that movements in money explained most of the fluctuations in output, and reinterpreted the Great Depression as the result of a major mistake in American monetary policy, failing to avoid a large contraction in the money supply during the 1930s.

At the same time, Friedman was sceptical as to the use of active monetary policy to stabilise output, believing that knowledge of the economy was too little to ensure that such policies would improve rather than worsen the situation. Instead, he advocated a simple monetary policy rule of maintaining a steady growth rate in money supply, which would not result in perfect short-run stabilisation, but in accordance with the quantity theory would ensure a steady long-run inflation rate. This came to be the main policy recommendation of the monetarists.

Consequently, the monetarist application of the quantity-theory approach aimed at removing monetary policy as a source of macroeconomic instability by targeting a constant, low growth rate of the money supply. The zenith of monetarist influence came during the late 1970s and the 1980s, after inflation had risen in many countries during the 1970s caused by the 1970s energy crisis, and the fixed exchange rate system among major Western economies known as the Bretton Woods system had been dissolved. In that situation several central banks turned to a money supply target in an attempt to reduce inflation. For instance the U.S. Federal Reserve System led by chairman Paul Volcker announced a money growth target, starting from October 1979.

The results were not satisfactory, however, because the relationship between monetary aggregates and other macroeconomic variables proved to be rather unstable. Similar results prevailed in other countries. Firstly, the relation between money growth and inflation turned out to be not very tight, even over 10-year periods, and secondly, the relation between the money supply and the interest rate in the short run turned out to be unreliable, too, making money growth an unreliable instrument to affect demand and output. The reason for both problems was frequent shifts in the demand for money during the period, partly because of changes in financial intermediation. This made velocity unpredictable and weakened the link between money and prices implied by the quantity theory. Milton Friedman later acknowledged that direct money supply targeting was less successful than he had hoped.

==== New classical economists ====
For a third group of post-war macroeconomists beside Keynesians and monetarists, the new classical economists, the quantity theory of money was also a doctrine of fundamental importance, but Robert E. Lucas and other leading new classical economists made serious efforts to specify and refine its theoretical meaning. These theoretical considerations involved serious changes as to the scope of countercyclical economic policy. The new classical model held that even in the short run, monetary policy could not be used to stabilize output as only unexpected changes in money could affect real variables. However, this view did not gain widespread support, failing to be confirmed by empirical tests. Empirically, evidence generally supports that there is a short-run linkage between money and economic activity.

=== After 1990: Decline of money supply targeting ===
Following the difficulties of the 1980s in conducting a satisfactory monetary policy by money supply targeting, most central banks, including the U.S. Federal Reserve, turned away from focusing on monetary aggregates, instead implementing their policies by setting short-term interest rates. Among monetary researchers, the demise of the money supply as a policy variable was recognized and rationalized by Michael Woodford.

From 1990, the new principle of inflation targets as the basis for a country's monetary policy gained popularity, starting with New Zealand and eventually spreading to most developed countries. Inflation targeting countries set interest rates to influence economic activity via the monetary transmission mechanism, eventually affecting inflation to fulfill their inflation targets. The communication of inflation targets helps to anchor the public inflation expectations, it makes central banks more accountable for their actions, and it reduces economic uncertainty among the participants in the economy.

Money supply (M2) for some time remained a leading economic indicator in the United States, but lost its status as such in the Conference Board Leading Economic Index in 2012, after it was ascertained that it had performed poorly as a leading indicator since 1989. Also in the policy making of the European Central Bank from 1999, monetary aggregates, which were initially officially assigned a prominent role as one of two pillars upon which the ECB monetary policy rested, were assigned a graduately more peripheral role among the indicators informing the bank's interest rate decisions.

== The equation of exchange ==
In its modern form, the quantity theory builds upon the following definitional relationship, formulated algebraically by Irving Fisher in 1911:

$$M\cdot V_T =\sum_{i} (p_i\cdot q_i)=\mathbf{p}^\mathrm{T}\mathbf{q},$$
where

- $M\,$ is the total amount of money in circulation on average in an economy during the period, say a year.
- $V_T\,$ is the transactions velocity of money, that is the average frequency across all transactions with which a unit of money is spent. This reflects availability of financial institutions, economic variables, and choices made as to how fast people turn over their money.
- $p_i\,$ and $q_i\,$ are the price and quantity of the i-th transaction.
- $\mathbf{p}$ is a column vector of the $p_i\,$, and the superscript ^{T} is the transpose operator.
- $\mathbf{q}$ is a column vector of the $q_i\,$.

Mainstream economics accepts a simplification, the equation of exchange, also called the quantity equation:

$$M\cdot V_T = P_T\cdot T,$$

where

- $P_T$ is the price level associated with transactions for the economy during the period,
- $T$ is an index of the real value of aggregate transactions.

The previous equation presents the difficulty that the associated data are not available for all transactions. With the development of national income and product accounts, emphasis shifted to national-income or final-product transactions, rather than gross transactions. Economists may alternatively use a specification where

- $V$ is the velocity of money in final expenditures or, equivalently, the income velocity of money,
- $Q$ is an index of the real value of final expenditures or, equivalently, income.

As an example, $M$ might represent currency plus deposits in checking and savings accounts held by the public, $Q$ real output (which equals real expenditure in macroeconomic equilibrium) with $P$ the corresponding price level, and $P\cdot Q$ the nominal (money) value of output. In one empirical formulation, velocity was taken to be "the ratio of net national product in current prices to the money stock".

=== From the quantity equation to the quantity theory ===
The quantity equation itself as stated above is uncontroversial, as it amounts to an identity or, equivalently, simply a definition of velocity: From the equation, velocity can be defined residually as the ratio of nominal output to the stock of money: $V=(P\cdot Q)/M$. Developing a theory out of the equation requires assumptions be made about the causal relationships among the four variables in this one equation. The crucial question is to which extent each of these variables is dependent upon the others. Without further restrictions, the equation does not require that a change in the money supply would change the value of any or all of $P$, $Q$, or $P\cdot Q$. For example, a 10% increase in $M$ could be accompanied by a change of 1/(1 + 10%) in $V$, leaving $P\cdot Q$ unchanged.

The quantity theory of money consequently goes further, resting in its basic form on three additional assumptions:

1. The amount of real output $Q$ is exogenous, being determined by other forces such as available production factors and production technology
2. Velocity $V$ is constant over time
3. The supply of money $M$ is also exogenous and can be controlled by the monetary authority (the central bank).

Under these three assumptions, there is a causal effect of M on P, and the central bank, by controlling money supply, will be able to directly control the price level of the economy. Specifically, a constant growth rate in the money stock will lead to a constant inflation rate, as long as real output grows at a constant rate.

The realism of each of the three assumptions has been debated over time, though, making the prominent monetarist economist David Laidler declare in 1991 that the quantity theory "is always and everywhere controversial". Firstly, most economists think that output can be affected by e.g. changes in demand including those that originate from monetary (or fiscal) policy in the short run, i.e. at any point in the business cycle, though in the medium and long run the assumption is more warranted. Indeed, the possibility of influencing and mitigating short-run output fluctuations is the basis for the stabilization policies of most central banks in developed countries today. Secondly, there is general agreement that velocity does change over time, and sometimes in unpredictable ways, because of changes in the money demand function; this may e.g. be the consequence of changes in the infrastructure of payment systems. This was considered a major problem during the 1970s and 1980s when several major central banks including the Federal Reserve tried conducting monetary policy following a money supply target. Thirdly, the exogeneity and control by the monetary authority of the money supply is questioned by some economists. James Tobin noted in 1970 that money might be correlated with output because money passively reacts to output. Central banks and consequently monetary bases can be said to react to events in the economy, and most of typical money supply measures are created by private commercial banks who may also be considered to be affected by the general economic atmosphere when carrying out their banking activities.

=== Cambridge approach ===
Economists Alfred Marshall, A.C. Pigou, and John Maynard Keynes (before he developed his own, eponymous school of thought) associated with Cambridge University, took a slightly different approach to the quantity equation, focusing on money demand instead of money supply. They argued that a certain portion of the money supply will not be used for transactions; instead, it will be held for the convenience and security of having cash on hand. This portion of cash is commonly represented as k, a portion of nominal income ($P \cdot Y$). The Cambridge economists also thought wealth would play a role, but wealth is often omitted for simplicity. The Cambridge equation is thus:

$$M^{\textit{d}}=\textit{k} \cdot P\cdot Y.$$

Assuming that the economy is at equilibrium ($M^{\textit{d}} = M$), $Y$ is exogenous, and k is fixed in the short run, the Cambridge equation is equivalent to the equation of exchange with velocity equal to the inverse of k:

$$M\cdot\frac{1}{k} = P\cdot Y.$$

The Cambridge version of the quantity equation was used in both Keynes's attack on the quantity theory and the Monetarist revival of the theory.

== Evidence ==
As restated by Milton Friedman, the quantity theory emphasizes the following relationship of the nominal value of expenditures $PQ$ and the price level $P$ to the quantity of money $M$:

$$\begin{align}
PQ&={f}(\overset{+}M) &(1)\\
P&={g}(\overset{+}M)&(2)
\end{align}$$

The plus signs indicate that a change in the money supply is hypothesized to change nominal expenditures and the price level in the same direction (for other variables held constant).

Milton Friedman made an influential case for the theory in his 1956 paper Studies in the quantity theory of money. Later, Friedman wrote in 1987 that the empirical regularity of a "connection between substantial changes in the quantity of money and in the level of prices" was perhaps the most-evidenced economic phenomenon on record, adding that "The statistical connection itself, however, tells nothing about direction of influence". According to Friedman, the short-run relation of a change in the money supply in the past has been relatively more associated with a change in real output $Q$ than the price level $P$ in (1), but with much variation in the precision, timing, and size of the relation. For the long-run, there has been stronger support for (1) and (2) and no systematic association of $Q$ and $M$.

In a more recent examination of data from 109 countries from 1991 onwards, it was found that inflation and money growth did not exhibit a proportional development; however, excess money growth did act as a predictor of inflation, but the effect during the time period examined was relatively low.

In 2016, Professor Harald Uhlig and two coauthors looked upon a cross-section of countries in the years 1970–2005. They found that for moderate-inflation countries (defined as countries with average inflation rates below 12%), the direct relationship between average inflation and the growth rate of money was very tenuous at best, though the fit could be improved by correcting for variation in output growth and the opportunity cost of money. They also found that for countries following inflation targeting, the fit of a one-for-one relationship between money growth and inflation was considerably lower than for other countries.

== Mainstream economists' views ==
Though more disputed in the 1970s, surveys of members of the American Economic Association since the 1990s have shown that most professional American economists generally agree with the statement: "Inflation is caused primarily by too much growth in the money supply."

== Criticism by non-mainstream economists ==
In the 1860s, Karl Marx modified the quantity theory by arguing that the labor theory of value requires that prices, under equilibrium conditions, are determined by socially necessary labor time needed to produce the commodity and that quantity of money was a function of the quantity of commodities, the prices of commodities, and the velocity.

In 1912, Ludwig von Mises agreed that there was a core of truth in the quantity theory, but criticized its focus on the supply of money without adequately explaining the demand for money. He said the theory "fails to explain the mechanism of variations in the value of money".

In his 1976 book The Denationalisation of Money, Friedrich Hayek described the quantity theory of money "as no more than a useful rough approximation to a really adequate explanation". According to him, the theory "becomes wholly useless where several concurrent distinct kinds of money are simultaneously in use in the same territory."

Trieu (2025) challenges the static nature of the equation of exchange, MV = PY, in monetary analysis and introduces a dynamic version that serves as the basis for exploring (i) the links between force, work, and the velocity of money; (ii) how the velocity of money from Fisher’s static equation is just a special case of the velocity from the new dynamic model; and (iii) the economic effects of an extreme force of money on inflation, output transactions, and economic structure. Unlike earlier models, this dynamic approach lets all variables change over time, offering a more realistic way to assess the impact of monetary policy and economic fluctuations.

== See also ==
- Classical dichotomy
- Credit theory of money
- Cumulative process
- Fiscal theory of the price level
- Guanzi (text)
- Metallism
  - Bimetallism
- Modern monetary theory
- Monetae cudendae ratio
- Monetary inflation
