= FRASER =

Digital archive

FRASER (Federal Reserve Archival System for Economic Research)
- Website type: Digital library; Economic history of the United States
- Owner: Federal Reserve Bank of St. Louis
- Website: fraser.stlouisfed.org
- Commercial: No
- Launched: 2004

The Federal Reserve Archival System for Economic Research (FRASER) is a digital archive begun in 2004 by the Federal Reserve Bank of St. Louis to safeguard, preserve and provide easy access to the United States' economic history, particularly the history of the Federal Reserve System, through digitization of documents related to the U.S. financial system.

== Documents available ==
Digitized documents include:

- Publications of the Federal Reserve Board of Governors
- Publications of each of the Federal Reserve banks
- Statements, speeches and archival materials of Federal Reserve policymakers
- Government data publications
- Statistical releases
- Congressional hearings
- Books
- Reports by various organizations

=== 2016 additions ===
FRASER in 2016 added: 1. The Commercial and Financial Chronicle (over 2000 issues in 68 volumes, mostly from 1871-1935).
2.The Federal Reserve Bank of St. Louis Financial Crisis Timeline and its original supporting documents, which includes a comprehensive collection of documents from the 2007-09 financial crisis.
3. The Robert Owen papers. OKlahoma's Senator Owen served from 1907–25, and was a co-sponsor of the Federal Reserve Act of 1913.
4. Publications and speeches from several Federal Reserve Banks.
5. FRASER also debuted a new "African Americans in the Economy" theme, featuring materials from the Department of Labor's Division of Negro Economics (1917–25).

== Collaborators ==
To create and maintain FRASER, the St. Louis Fed collaborated with the Federal Depository Library Program libraries (collaboration begin in 2005) United States Government Printing Office, and several university and public libraries.

== Reception ==
FRASER has been praised by advocates of government transparency for continually adding to its collection of freely available historical documents.

== See also ==
- Federal Reserve Economic Data (FRED)
- Research Papers in Economics (RePEc)
