= A Tract on Monetary Reform =

1923 book by John Maynard Keynes

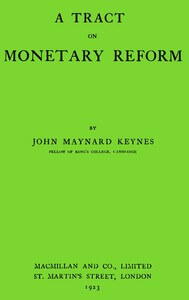
- First edition cover
- Author: John Maynard Keynes
- Language: English
- Subject: Monetary policy, Exchange rate, Gold standard
- Genre: Economics
- Publisher: Macmillan and Co., Ltd.
- Publication date: 1923
- Publication place: United Kingdom
- Media type: Print
- Preceded by: The Economic Consequences of the Peace (1919)
- Followed by: A Treatise on Money (1930)

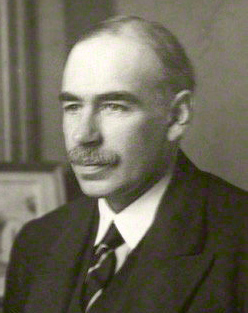
Keynes in the 1920s

A Tract on Monetary Reform is a book by John Maynard Keynes, published in 1923. Keynes presented an argument in favour of a policy that would try to stabilize the domestic price level. He argued that the Bank of England had the policy tools available to provide a semblance of price stability through its stance on interest rates and its capacity to manage the reserves of the banking sector. Keynes believed that domestic price stability was accompanied by exchange rate flexibility. After years of experience, he did not favour floating exchange rates and proposed what is today called a crawling peg.

== Background ==
The book was written during a period of significant monetary instability following World War I, when many countries were debating whether to return to the pre-war gold standard. Keynes wrote the tract as European economies struggled with inflation, deflation, and exchange rate volatility. The work built upon his earlier criticism of the Versailles Treaty and reflected growing skepticism of orthodox monetary policy.

== Main arguments ==
=== Price stability vs. exchange rate stability ===
Keynes's central thesis in A Tract on Monetary Reform was that countries should prioritize domestic price stability over exchange rate stability. He argued that maintaining fixed exchange rates under the gold standard had too high a cost to domestic economic stability. Instead, he advocated for a managed monetary policy that would focus on maintaining stable domestic prices.

=== Monetary policy tools ===
Keynes contended that the Bank of England possessed adequate policy instruments to achieve price stability through:

- Interest rate management: Using discount rates to influence credit conditions and economic activity
- Banking sector reserves: Managing commercial bank reserves to control lending and the money supply
- Active monetary policy: Moving away from automatic gold standard mechanisms toward discretionary policy-making

=== Exchange rate policy ===
Rather than supporting freely floating exchange rates, Keynes proposed what would later be recognized as a "crawling peg" system. Under this arrangement, exchange rates would adjust gradually rather than being allowed to fluctuate freely or remaining rigidly fixed. This represented a middle path between the extremes of fixed and floating exchange rate regimes.

=== Critique of the gold standard ===
The book contains a significant critique of the gold standard, which Keynes famously described as a "barbarous relic." He argued that the automatic adjustment mechanisms of the gold standard imposed unnecessary costs on domestic economies and that managed monetary systems could achieve better outcomes.

== Content ==
A Tract on Monetary Reform is divided into chapters that develop Keynes's arguments:

- Analysis of inflation and deflation distributive effects
- Public Finance and changes in the value of money
- Critique of theory of money and exchange
- Proposals for reforming monetary policy
- Discussion of coordinating monetary management internationally

== Influence and reception ==
The book influenced monetary economics and policy circles, contributing to debates about exchange rate systems that would continue through the Bretton Woods era and beyond. Keynes's arguments for managed monetary policy and his critique of the gold standard helped prepare the eventual abandonment of gold-based monetary systems.

The work also demonstrated Keynes's evolving economic thought, showing his movement away from classical economic orthodoxy that would culminate in his later revolutionary economic theories.

=== Legacy ===
A Tract on Monetary Reform remains significant for several reasons. It:

- provides insight into Keynesian economic theory development
- offers a contemporary analysis of post-WWI monetary problems
- anticipates later debates about optimal exchange rate regimes
- demonstrates early applications of what would become known as Keynesian policy activism

The book's arguments about the trade-off between exchange rate stability and domestic price stability continue to influence modern discussions of monetary policy, particularly in the context of European monetary union and emerging market exchange rate policies.

The Tract is the source of Keynes's famous remark, "in the long run we are all dead." This occurs in the context of noting that price level should vary in direct proportion to money quantity if other variables return to their former values, but the short-term dynamics of this process have practical importance.

=== Publication history ===
The book was first published by Macmillan and Co., Ltd. in 1923 and has been reprinted.

== See also ==
- The Economic Consequences of the Peace
- The General Theory of Employment, Interest and Money
- Gold standard
- Keynesian economics
- Monetary policy
- Exchange rate regime
- Monetary reform
