= Velocity of money =

Rate of money changing hands

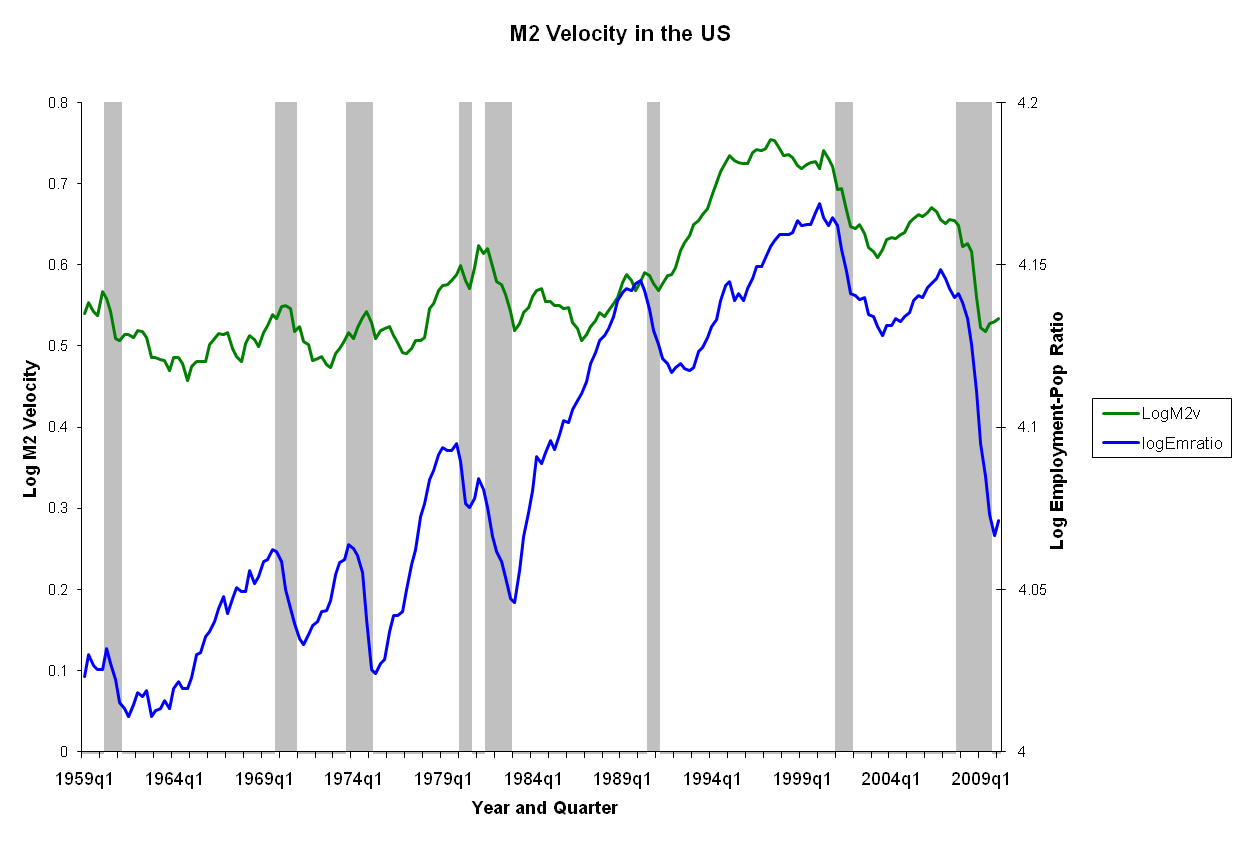
Chart showing the log of the velocity (green) of the U.S. M2, calculated by dividing nominal GDP by the M2 stock (M1 plus time deposits), 1959–2010. The employment-to-population ratio is displayed in blue, for information, and periods of recession are represented with gray bars.

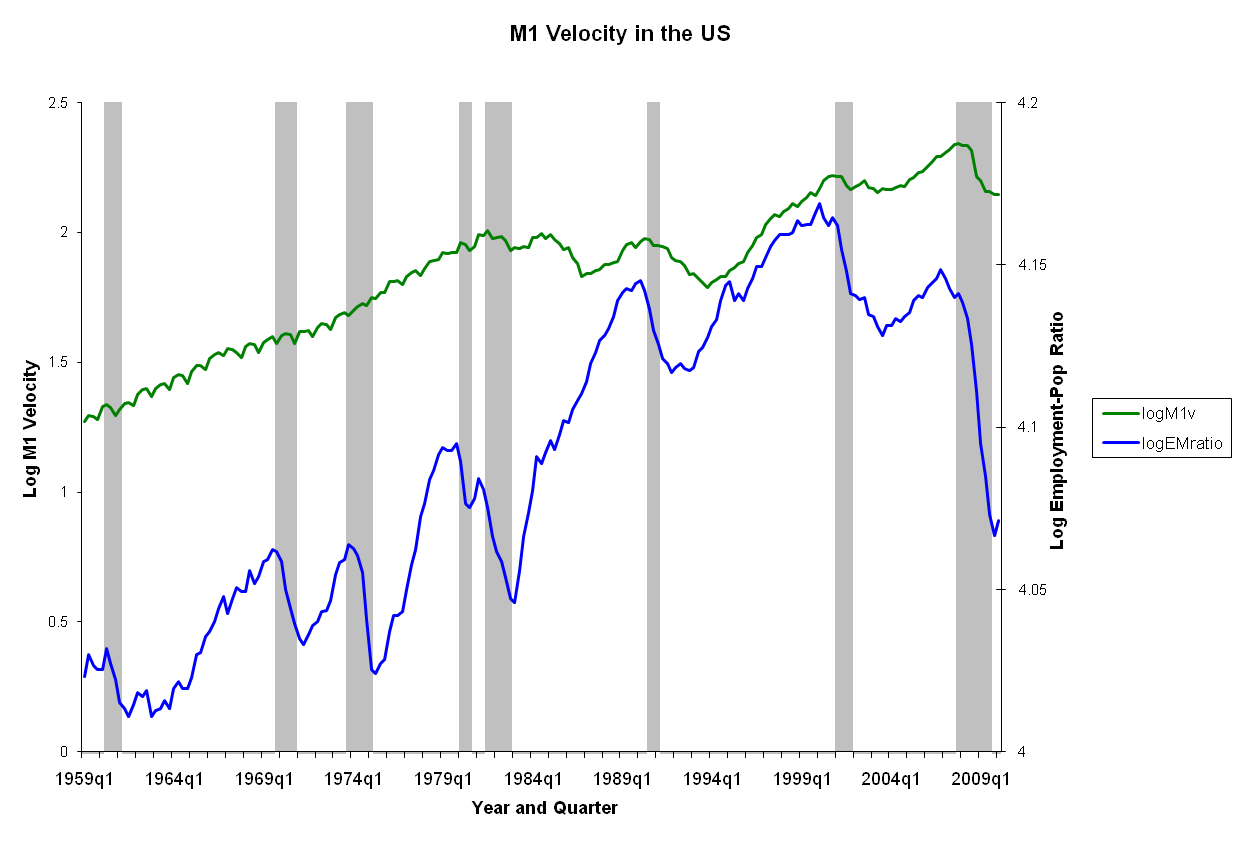
Similar chart showing the logged velocity (green) of a slightly narrower measure M1 of money consisting of currency and liquid deposits, 1959–2010. Employment again shown in blue, recessions as grey bars.

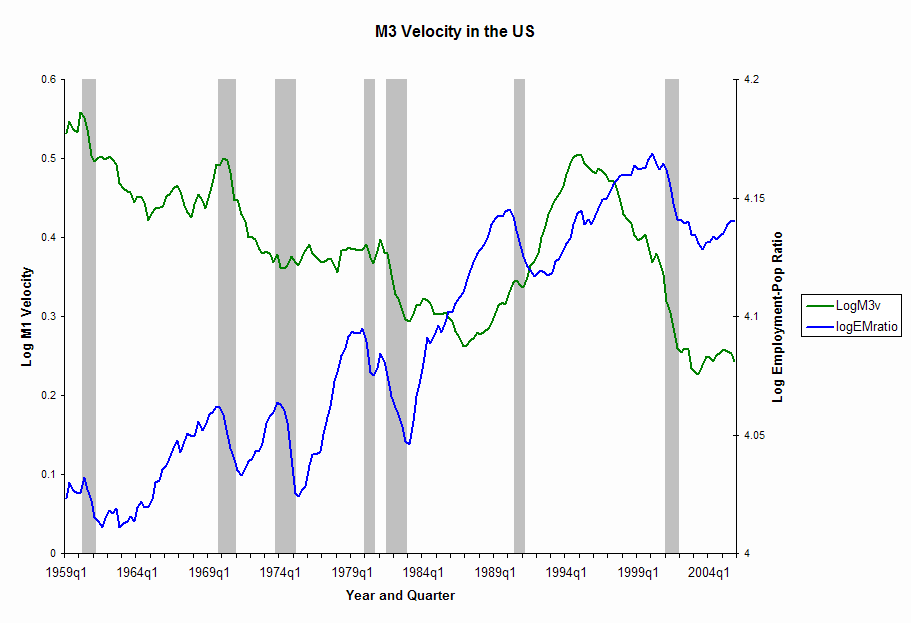
Similar chart showing the logged velocity (green) of a broader measure of money M3 that covers M2 plus large institutional deposits. The US no longer publishes official M3 measures, so the chart only runs through 2005. Employment again shown in blue, recessions as grey bars.

The velocity of money measures how many times one unit of currency is used to purchase goods and services within a given time period. In other words, it represents how many times per period money changes hands, or circulates to other owners in return for valuable goods and services. The concept relates the size of economic activity to a given money supply. The velocity of money is one of the variables that determine inflation. The velocity of money is usually measured as the ratio of a country's or an economy's nominal gross national product (GNP) to its money supply.

If the velocity of money is increasing, transactions occur more frequently. The velocity of money changes over time and is influenced by many factors. Because of the nature of financial transactions, economists cannot determine the velocity of money empirically.

== Illustration ==
If, for example, in a very small economy, a farmer and a mechanic, with just $50 between them, buy new goods and services from each other in just three transactions over the course of a year

- A farmer spends $50 on tractor repair from a mechanic.
- The mechanic buys $40 of corn from the farmer.
- The mechanic spends $10 on barn cats from the farmer.

then $100 changed hands in the course of a year, even though there is only $50 in this little economy. That $100 level is possible because each dollar was spent on new goods and services an average of twice a year, which is to say that the velocity was $2/\text{year}$. If the farmer bought a used tractor from the mechanic or made a gift to the mechanic, it would not go into the numerator of velocity because that transaction would not be part of this tiny economy's gross domestic product (GDP).

== Relation to money demand ==
The velocity of money provides another perspective on money demand. Given the nominal flow of transactions using money, if the interest rate on alternative financial assets is high, people will not want to hold much money relative to the quantity of their transactions—they try to exchange it fast for goods or other financial assets, and money is said to "burn a hole in their pocket" and velocity is high. This situation is precisely one of money demand being low. Conversely, with a low opportunity cost, velocity is low and money demand is high. Both situations contribute to the time-varying nature of the money demand. In money market equilibrium, some economic variables (interest rates, income, or the price level) have adjusted to equate money demand and money supply.

The quantitative relation between velocity and money demand is given by Velocity = Nominal Transactions (however defined) divided by Nominal Money Demand.

== Indirect measurement ==
In practice, attempts to measure the velocity of money are usually indirect. The transactions velocity can be computed as

$$V_T =\frac{PT}{M}$$

where

$V_T\,$ is the velocity of money for all transactions in a given time frame;
$P\,$ is the price level;
$T\,$ is the amount of transactions occurring in a given time frame; and
$M\,$ is the total nominal amount of money in circulation on average in the economy (see “Money supply” for details).

Thus $PT$ is the total nominal amount of transactions per period.

Values of $PT$ and $M$ permit calculation of $V_T$.

Similarly, the income velocity of money may be written as

$$V =\frac{PQ}{M}$$

where

$V\,$ is the velocity for transactions counting towards national or domestic product;
$Q\,$ is an index of real expenditures (on newly produced goods and services); and
$PQ\,$ is nominal national or domestic product.

== Determination ==
The determinants and consequent stability of the velocity of money are a subject of controversy across and within schools of economic thought. Those favoring a quantity theory of money have tended to believe that, in the absence of inflationary or deflationary expectations, velocity will be technologically determined and stable, and that such expectations will not generally arise without a signal that overall prices have changed or will change.

This determinant has come under scrutiny in 2020-2021 as the levels of M1 and M2 Money Supply grow at an increasingly volatile rate while Velocity of M1 and M2 flattens to stable new low of a 1.10 ratio. While interest rates have remained stable under the Fed Rate, the economy is saving more M1 and M2 rather than consuming, in the expectations that Fed benchmark interest rate increases from all-time lows of 0.50%. During this time, inflation has risen to new decade highs without the velocity of money.

== Criticism ==
Ludwig von Mises, in a 1968 letter to Henry Hazlitt, said: "The main deficiency of the velocity of circulation concept is that it does not start from the actions of individuals but looks at the problem from the angle of the whole economic system. This concept in itself is a vicious mode of approaching the problem of prices and purchasing power. It is assumed that, other things being equal, prices must change in proportion to the changes occurring in the total supply of money available. This is not true."

Trieu (2025) challenges the static nature of the equation of exchange, MV = PY, in monetary analysis and introduces a dynamic version that serves as the basis for exploring (i) the links between force, work, and the velocity of money; (ii) how the velocity of money from Fisher’s static equation is just a special case of the velocity from the new dynamic model; and (iii) the economic effects of an extreme force of money on inflation, output transactions, and economic structure. Unlike earlier models, this dynamic approach lets all variables change over time, offering a more realistic way to assess the impact of monetary policy and economic fluctuations.

== See also ==
- Demurrage currency, a type of currency which could increase the velocity of money
