= Wicksell =

Wicksell is a surname. Notable people with the surname include:

- Katarina Wicksell (born 1979), Swedish footballer
- Knut Wicksell (1851–1926), Swedish economist
- Ragnar Wicksell (1892–1974), Swedish football player
- Sven Dag Wicksell (1890–1939), Swedish statistician

== See also ==
- Wicksell effect
- Wicksell's theory of capital
