= Fisher effect =

Tendency for nominal interest rate to follow changes in inflation

In economics, the Fisher effect is the tendency for nominal interest rates to change to follow the inflation rate. It is named after the economist Irving Fisher, who first observed and explained this relationship. Fisher proposed that the real interest rate is independent of monetary measures (known as the Fisher hypothesis), therefore, the nominal interest rate will adjust to accommodate any changes in expected inflation.

== Derivation ==
The nominal interest rate is the accounting interest rate – the percentage by which the amount of dollars (or other currency) owed by a borrower to a lender grows over time, while the real interest rate is the percentage by which the real purchasing power of the loan grows over time. In other words, the real interest rate is the nominal interest rate adjusted for the effect of inflation on the purchasing power of the outstanding loan.

The relation between nominal and real interest rates, and inflation, is approximately given by the Fisher equation:

$$r = i - \pi^e$$

The equation states that the real interest rate ($r$), is equal to the nominal interest rate ($i$) minus the expected inflation rate ($\pi^e$).

The equation is an approximation; however, the difference with the correct value is small as long as the interest rate and the inflation rate is low. The discrepancy becomes large if either the nominal interest rate or the inflation rate is high. The accurate equation can be expressed using periodic compounding as:

$$1+i =(1+r)\times (1+\pi^e)$$

If the real rate $r$ is assumed to be constant, the nominal rate $i$ must change point-for-point when $\pi^e$ rises or falls. Thus, the Fisher effect states that there will be a one-for-one adjustment of the nominal interest rate to the expected inflation rate.

The implication of the conjectured constant real rate is that monetary events such as monetary policy actions will have no effect on the real economy—for example, no effect on real spending by consumers on consumer durables and by businesses on machinery and equipment.

== Alternative hypotheses ==
Some contrary models assert that, for example, a rise in expected inflation would increase current real spending contingent on any nominal rate and hence increase income, limiting the rise in the nominal interest rate that would be necessary to re-equilibrate money demand with money supply at any time. In this scenario, a rise in expected inflation $\pi^e$ results in only a smaller rise in the nominal interest rate $i$ and thus a decline in the real interest rate $r$. It has also been contended that the Fisher hypothesis may break down in times of both quantitative easing and financial sector recapitalisation.

== Related concepts ==
The international Fisher effect predicts an international exchange rate drift entirely based on the respective national nominal interest rates. A related concept is Fisher parity.

== See also ==
- Monetary policy
- Monetary policy reaction function
- Taylor rule
- McCallum rule
- Friedman's k-percent rule
