= Katsuhito Iwai =

Japanese economist and critic (born 1947)

- 岩井 克人
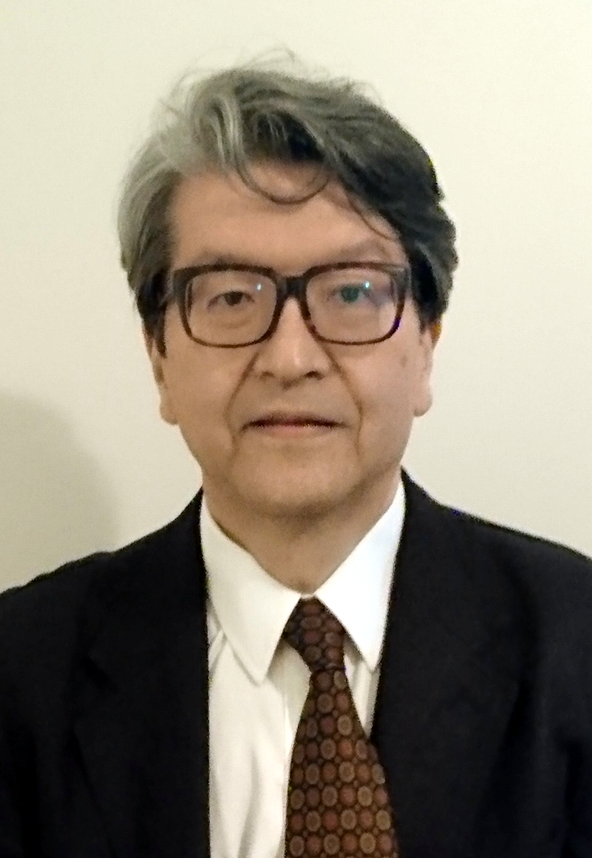
- Katsuhito Iwai
- Born: February 13, 1947 (age 79); Shibuya, Tokyo, Japan
- Spouse: Minae Mizumura

Academic background
- Education: MIT (Ph.D. 1972); University of Tokyo (B.A. 1969)
- Doctoral advisor: Robert Solow
- Influences: Knut Wicksell; Paul Samuelson; Hirofumi Uzawa

Academic work
- Discipline: Disequilibrium macroeconomics
- Institutions: International Christian University; Musashino University; University of Siena; University of Pennsylvania; Princeton University; University of Tokyo; Cowles Foundation; Yale University; University of California, Berkeley
- Doctoral students: Willem Buiter

Katsuhito Iwai (岩井 克人, Iwai Katsuhito; born February 13, 1947) is a Japanese economist and critic. He has studied the theory of money, macro dynamics, evolutionary economics, philosophy of corporations, fiduciary law, and the history of sociology. His work includes the book, Disequilibrium Dynamics (Yale University Press, 1981), and many articles published in academic journals. He has also written books and articles in newspapers and magazines for the general public on a wide variety of subjects ranging from global capitalism, post-modernity, civil society, money and language to literature and movies. His keen observations and analysis of the works of Shakespeare, Marx, J. S. G. Boggs, and Ihara Saikaku have established him as one of the foremost essayists in Japan.

== Biography ==
=== Education ===
Katsuhito Iwai entered the University of Tokyo, Japan in 1965. After graduating in 1969, he went on to study economics at MIT in Cambridge, Massachusetts where he received his Ph.D. in 1972.

=== Career ===
He was an assistant research economist at the University of California at Berkeley from 1972 to 1973 and an assistant professor of economics at Yale University from 1973 to 1979. He served as a senior research associate at the Cowles Foundation for Research in Economics, Yale University from 1979 to 1981. Since then, he has been associate professor and then professor of economics at the University of Tokyo.

He was also a visiting professor of economics at the University of Pennsylvania, and a visiting associate professor of international affairs at the Woodrow Wilson School, Princeton University from 1988 to 1989. He was a visiting fellow in Dipartimento di Economia Politica, Università di Siena in 1997. He served as the dean of Graduate School of Economics and Faculty of Economics at the University of Tokyo from 2001 to 2003. He has been a member of Science Council of Japan from 2005. In 2009, the University of Belgrade awarded him an honorary doctorate.

He won the 1982 Grand Prix of Nikkei Economics Book Award for his book, Disequilibrium Dynamics – A Theoretical Analysis of Inflation and Unemployment, the 1993 Suntory Academic Award for his book, On Money, and the 2003 Kobayashi Hideo Award for his book, What Will Become of the Corporation? In 2007, he was awarded the Purple Ribbon Medal for academic distinction by the Government of Japan.

=== Contributions ===
Katsuhito Iwai is known to have integrated Knut Wicksell's theory of cumulative process and J. M. Keynes' theory of effective demand. He has demonstrated that, if, in a monetary economy, prices and wages are flexible, a deviation from equilibrium inevitably produces firms' expectational errors and starts a dynamic process that drives prices and wages cumulatively away from equilibrium. He has then argued in opposition to the neoclassical view of the self-regulating nature of laissez-faire market mechanism, that what stabilizes the monetary economy is the inflexibility of money wages and that an equilibrium it gravitates to almost never achieves full-employment. He has proven that the trade-off between unemployment and inflation never ceases to exist no matter how long the time span.

Katsuhito Iwai is often cited for his formulation of a bootstrap theory of money. Everybody uses money as money, Iwai writes, because everybody else uses money as money. He has offered proof, in his search-theoretic model of decentralized exchanges, that, to sustain itself as an equilibrium, the monetary system requires no "real" conditions.

Iwai is credited with constructing mathematical models of Schumpeterian evolutionary processes that describe how large numbers of firms interact with one another, by competing to innovate, trying to imitate and struggling to grow. Over a long span of time, Iwai argues, what the economy approaches is not a neoclassical equilibrium of uniform technology, but at best a statistical equilibrium of technological disequilibria. Profits in excess of normal rate, therefore, never vanish from the economy.

Iwai has also built a new theory of the corporation and of corporate governance. According to Iwai's famed characterization, business corporation is an entity consisting of two-tier ownership relations. The shareholders own the corporation as a legal thing, and the corporation as a legal person owns the corporate assets in turn. This person-thing duality of the corporation, Iwai states, is behind the age-old controversy over what the essence of corporate personality is. The person-thing duality of the corporation also causes what we observe among the contemporary advanced capitalist economies around the world in terms of their highly varied corporate structures.

In light of these theorizations, Iwai has revived the traditional principle of corporate governance where the managers' fiduciary duties toward the corporation serve as its very foundation. In recent years, Iwai has been known to be involved in his attempts at developing a non-contractual theory of fiduciary law.

== Selected publications ==
=== Book ===
- Iwai, Katsuhito (1981). Disequilibrium Dynamics: Theoretical Analysis of Inflation and Unemployment (PDF). Monograph (Yale University. Cowles Foundation for Research in Economics). Vol. 27. New Haven, Connecticut: Yale University Press. ISBN 9780300025569.

=== Journal articles ===
- Iwai, Katsuhito (1972). "Optimal economic growth and stationary ordinal utility --A fisherian approach" (PDF). Journal of Economic Theory. 5 (1): 121–151. doi:10.1016/0022-0531(72)90122-6.
- Iwai, Katsuhito (1974). "The Firm in Uncertain Markets and Its Price, Wage and Employment Adjustments". Review of Economic Studies. 41 (2): 257–276. doi:10.2307/2296715. JSTOR 2296715.
- Iwai, Katsuhito (1984). "Schumpeterian dynamics: An evolutionary model of innovation and imitation" (PDF). Journal of Economic Behavior & Organization. 5 (2): 159–190. doi:10.1016/0167-2681(84)90017-9.
- Iwai, Katsuhito (1984). "Schumpeterian dynamics, Part II: Technological progress, firm growth and 'economic selection'" (PDF). Journal of Economic Behavior & Organization. 5 (3–4): 321–351. doi:10.1016/0167-2681(84)90005-2.
- Iwai, Katsuhito (1996). "The bootstrap theory of money: A search-theoretic foundation of monetary economics". Structural Change and Economic Dynamics. 7 (4): 451–477. doi:10.1016/S0954-349X(96)00060-4.
- Iwai, Katsuhito (1999). "Persons, Things and Corporations: The Corporate Personality Controversy and Comparative Corporate Governance" (PDF). American Journal of Comparative Law. 47 (4): 583–632. doi:10.2307/841070. JSTOR 841070. S2CID 148729931.

== Honours ==
- Medal with Purple Ribbon (2007)
- Person of Cultural Merit (2016)
- Order of Culture (2023)
