= Monetarist paradox =

The Monetarist Paradox is a concept that has its roots in classical monetary economics and runs counter to Keynesian monetary theory. It can be stated as follows: An easy money policy leads (in the long run) to high (nominal) interest rates, and vice versa.

== Explanation of the process ==
The concept was clearly adumbrated by Milton Friedman by combining the expectations augmented Phillips curve, based on the natural rate hypothesis, with the Fisher equation for the determination of nominal interest rates. In his Presidential Address in December 1967 to the American Economic Association, he stated, “Paradoxically, the monetary authority could assure low nominal rates of interest - but to do so it would have to start out in what seems like the opposite direction, by engaging in a deflationary monetary policy.”

When the central bank lowers its policy rate, that increases demand through various channels, pushing the economy below the natural rate of unemployment and actual output above its potential. This in turn pushes up inflation. In response to the rise in inflation, market interest rates will tend to rise due to the Fisher effect. To prevent further overheating of the economy and to restore demand to a normal level the central bank will then be compelled to raise the policy rate higher than the original starting rate. Thus the easy money policy which lowered the nominal rate in the short run raised it in the long run, which is the paradox. This fundamental and vital paradox, going back to earlier centuries and that has shaped current central bank policies, should not be confused with other propositions and paradoxes bearing the same name.

== Definition ==
The term itself was coined by economist Vivek Moorthy in a co authored study of debt stability (2000). This phenomenon has been discussed and/or the expression used in various publications, even earlier (1995, 2004, 2007, 2016). In correspondence, Milton Friedman stated that, “ I have not myself seen the phrase “monetarist paradox” used to refer to the phenomenon that easy money makes for high interest rates, but it does seem a reasonably apt description”(2005).

== Evidence ==
The scatter plot below of the average discount rate of select, developed country central banks against the Alesina-Summers index of central bank independence (x-axis) provides strong evidence globally over two decades in favour of the phenomenon. Germany and Switzerland with the most independent central banks that follow tight money policies have the lowest rates in the chart below, while Italy, with the least independent central bank has the highest interest rate.

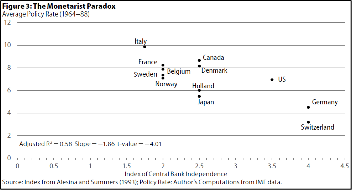

Source: Vivek Moorthy, October 2016, Economic and Political Weekly, 51(40), 33–39. https://www.jstor.org/stable/44165759 (Refer in case the image is not clear)

== Origins ==
Prior to Milton Friedman, two leading monetary economists had discussed the process. First, Irving Fisher in his Appreciation and Interest (1893), citing an anonymous pamphlet from Boston, 1740 of an anonymous Boston tea planter and second Sir Dennis Robertson (1937). Second, Sir Dennis Robertson, formidable critic of Keynes’ liquidity preference theory of interest. In his review essay of Keynes’ General Theory, Robertson wrote, “Marshall’s explanation of the paradox is given in a famous sentence: “the increase of currency increases the willingness of lenders to lend in the first instance, and lowers the rate of discount. But afterwards it raises prices and therefore tends to increase discount.”
