= Paving Wall Street =

Paving Wall Street: Experimental Economics and the Quest for the Perfect Market
- 1st ed.
- Author: Ross M. Miller
- Language: English
- Subject: Experimental economics, market mechanism
- Publisher: John Wiley & Sons
- Publication date: 2002
- Publication place: United States
- Media type: print
- Pages: 336
- ISBN: 0-471-12198-3

Paving Wall Street: Experimental Economics and the Quest for the Perfect Market (later reprinted under the title Experimental Economics: How We Can Build Better Financial Markets) is a book about finance, experimental economics and market design, written by Ross Miller (foreword by Vernon L. Smith), published in 2002. One reviewer described the book as explaining "developments in finance, game theory, and experimental economics to give a clear and up-to-date picture of rocket science as it is applied at the highest levels on Wall Street."
