= Wicksellian Differential =

Term in economics

The Wicksellian Differential is derived from Knut Wicksell's theory of interest and is an approximation of the extent of disequilibrium in an economy.

Formula: Wicksellian Differential = Natural Rate of Interest - Money Rate of Interest

Wicksell argued in Interest and Prices that the equilibrium of a credit economy could be ascertained by comparing the money rate of interest to the natural rate of interest. In modern terminology this equates to comparing the cost of capital with the return on capital. In economies where the natural rate is higher than the money rate, credit growth will drive a positive disequilibrium in an economy. When the natural rate of interest is lower than the money rate, the demand for credit dries up leading to a negative disequilibrium and capital destruction.

Wicksell also argued that prices would be stable when the two rates of interest were in equilibrium, an idea that was subsequently demonstrated to have been flawed by Gunnar Myrdal and Friedrich Hayek in the late 1920s and early 1930s.

The Wicksellian Differential therefore provides an alternative estimation of the extent of disequilibrium in a credit-based economy to more standard Taylor Rule approaches which attempt to estimate deviations from a general equilibrium based on the fluctuations in output and the general price level.
