= Taylor rule =

Rule from monetary policy

The Taylor rule is a monetary policy targeting rule. The rule was proposed in 1992 by American economist John B. Taylor for central banks to use to stabilize economic activity by appropriately setting short-term interest rates. The rule considers the federal funds rate, the price level and changes in real income. The Taylor rule computes the optimal federal funds rate based on the gap between the desired (targeted) inflation rate and the actual inflation rate; and the output gap between the actual and natural output level. According to Taylor, monetary policy is stabilizing when the nominal interest rate is higher/lower than the increase/decrease in inflation. Thus the Taylor rule prescribes a relatively high interest rate when actual inflation is higher than the inflation target.

In the United States, the Federal Open Market Committee controls monetary policy. The committee attempts to achieve an average inflation rate of 2% (with an equal likelihood of higher or lower inflation). The main advantage of a general targeting rule is that a central bank gains the discretion to apply multiple means to achieve the set target.

The monetary policy of the Federal Reserve changed throughout the 20th century. Taylor and others evaluate the period between the 1960s and the 1970s as a period of poor monetary policy; the later years are typically characterized as stagflation. The inflation rate was high and increasing, while interest rates were kept low. Since the mid-1970s monetary targets have been used in many countries as a means to target inflation. However, in the 2000s the actual interest rate in advanced economies, notably in the US, was kept below the value suggested by the Taylor rule.

The Taylor rule represents a rules-based approach to monetary policy, standing in contrast to discretionary policy where central bankers make decisions based on their judgment and interpretation of economic conditions. While the rule provides a systematic framework that can enhance policy predictability and transparency, critics argue that its simplified formula—focusing primarily on inflation and output—may not adequately capture important factors such as financial stability, exchange rates, or structural changes in the economy. This debate between rules and discretion remains central to discussions of monetary policy implementation.

== Equation ==
According to Taylor's original version of the rule, the real policy interest rate should respond to divergences of actual inflation rates from target inflation rates and of actual Gross Domestic Product (GDP) from potential GDP:

$$i_t = \pi_t + r_t^* + a_\pi ( \pi_t - \pi_t^* ) + a_y \cdot 100 ( Y_t - \bar Y_t )/ \bar Y_t.$$

In this equation, $i_t$ is the target short-term nominal policy interest rate (e.g. the federal funds rate in the US, the Bank of England base rate in the UK), $\pi_t$ is the rate of inflation as measured by the GDP deflator, $\pi^*_t$ is the desired rate of inflation, $r_t^*$ is the assumed natural/equilibrium interest rate, $Y_t$ is the actual GDP, and $\bar Y_t$ is the potential output, as determined by a linear trend. $100(Y_t - \bar Y_t)/ \bar Y_t$ is the output gap, in percentage points.

Because of $i_t - \pi_t = \mbox{real policy interest rate}$,

$$\begin{align}
\mbox{Desired real policy interest rate} &= \mbox{equilibrium real interest rate} \\
&+ a_{\pi} \times \mbox{difference from the inflation target} \\
&+ a_y \times \mbox{output gap} \\
\end{align}$$

In this equation, both $a_{\pi}$ and $a_y$ should be positive (as a rough rule of thumb, Taylor's 1993 paper proposed setting $a_{\pi}=a_y=0.5$). That is, the rule produces a relatively high real interest rate (a "tight" monetary policy) when inflation is above its target or when output is above its full-employment level, in order to reduce inflationary pressure. It recommends a relatively low real interest rate ("easy" monetary policy) in the opposite situation, to stimulate output. In this way, the Taylor rule is inherently counter-cyclical, as it prescribes policy actions that lean against the direction of economic fluctuations. Sometimes monetary policy goals may conflict, as in the case of stagflation, when inflation is above its target with a substantial output gap. In such a situation, a Taylor rule specifies the relative weights given to reducing inflation versus increasing output.

== Principle ==
By specifying $a_{\pi}>0$, the Taylor rule says that an increase in inflation by one percentage point should prompt the central bank to raise the nominal interest rate by more than one percentage point (specifically, by $1+a_{\pi}$, the sum of the two coefficients on $\pi_t$ in the equation). Since the real interest rate is (approximately) the nominal interest rate minus inflation, stipulating $a_{\pi}>0$ implies that when inflation rises, the real interest rate should be increased. The idea that the nominal interest rate should be raised "more than one-for-one" to cool the economy when inflation increases (that is increasing the real interest rate) has been called the Taylor principle. The Taylor principle presumes a unique bounded equilibrium for inflation. If the Taylor principle is violated, then the inflation path may be unstable.

== History ==
The concept of a policy rule emerged as part of the discussion on whether monetary policy should be based on intuition/discretion. The discourse began at the beginning of the 19th century. The first formal debate forum was launched in the 1920s by the US House Committee on Banking and Currency. In the hearing on the so-called Strong bill, introduced in 1923 by Representative James G. Strong of Kansas, the conflict in the views on monetary policy clearly appeared. New York Fed Governor Benjamin Strong Jr. (no relation to Representative Strong), supported by Professors John R. Commons and Irving Fisher, was concerned about the Fed's practices that attempted to ensure price stability. In his opinion, Federal Reserve policy regarding the price level could not guarantee long-term stability. After the death of Governor Strong in 1928, political debate on changing the Fed's policy was suspended. The Fed had been dominated by Strong and his New York Reserve Bank.

After the Great Depression hit the country, policies came under debate. Irving Fisher opined, "this depression was almost wholly preventable and that it would have been prevented if Governor Strong had lived, who was conducting open-market operations with a view of bringing about stability". Later on, monetarists such as Milton Friedman and Anna Schwartz agreed that high inflation could be avoided if the Fed managed the quantity of money more consistently.

The economic downturn of the early 1960s in the United States occurred despite the Federal Reserve maintaining relatively high interest rates to defend the dollar under the Bretton Woods system. After the collapse of Bretton Woods in 1971, the Federal Reserve shifted its focus toward stimulating economic growth through expansionary monetary policy and lower interest rates. This accommodative policy stance, combined with supply shocks from oil price increases, contributed to the Great Inflation of the 1970s when annual inflation rates reached double digits.

Beginning in the mid-1970s, central banks increasingly adopted monetary targeting frameworks to combat inflation. During the Great Moderation from the mid-1980s through the early 2000s, major central banks including the Federal Reserve and the Bank of England generally followed policy approaches aligned with the Taylor rule, which provided a systematic framework for setting interest rates. This period was marked by low and stable inflation in most advanced economies. A significant shift in monetary policy frameworks began in 1990 when New Zealand pioneered explicit inflation targeting. The Reserve Bank of New Zealand underwent reforms that enhanced its independence and established price stability as its primary mandate. This approach was soon adopted by other central banks: the Bank of Canada implemented inflation targeting in 1991, followed by the central banks of Sweden, Finland, Australia, Spain, Israel, and Chile by 1994.

From the early 2000s onward, major central banks in advanced economies, particularly the Federal Reserve, maintained policy rates consistently below levels prescribed by the Taylor rule. This deviation reflected a new policy framework where central banks increasingly focused on financial stability while still operating under inflation-targeting mandates. Central banks adopted an asymmetric approach: they responded aggressively to financial market stress and economic downturns with substantial rate cuts, but were more gradual in raising rates during recoveries. This pattern became especially pronounced following shocks like the dot-com bubble burst, the 2008 financial crisis, and subsequent economic disruptions, leading to extended periods of accommodative monetary policy.

== Alternative versions ==
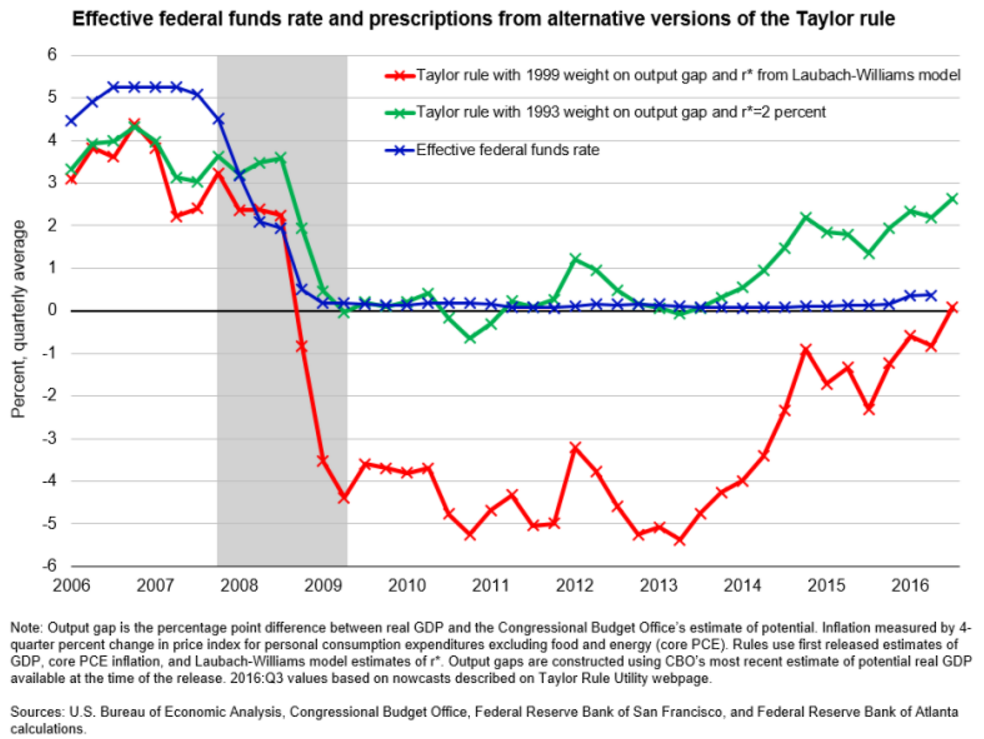
Effective federal funds rate and prescriptions from alternate versions of the Taylor Rule

While the Taylor principle has proven influential, debate remains about what else the rule should incorporate. According to some New Keynesian macroeconomic models, insofar as the central bank keeps inflation stable, the degree of fluctuation in output will be optimized (economists Olivier Blanchard and Jordi Gali call this property the 'divine coincidence'). In this case, the central bank does not need to take fluctuations in the output gap into account when setting interest rates (that is, it may optimally set $a_y=0$.)

Other economists proposed adding terms to the Taylor rule to take into account financial conditions: for example, the interest rate might be raised when stock prices, housing prices, or interest rate spreads increase. Taylor offered a modified rule in 1999: that specified $a_{\pi} = 0.5, a_y \ge 0$.

The standard Taylor rule imposes constant, symmetric response coefficients on the inflation and output gaps — a restriction that is unlikely to hold across the business cycle. Linearity can be problematic for several reasons: the effective lower bound creates an asymmetric policy space that a fixed rule cannot accommodate; the unobservable inputs (potential output, the natural rate) enter linearly, amplifying real-time measurement error; and empirical work finds that policy coefficients shift across regimes and Fed chairs, making a single fixed specification a poor description of actual behaviour. Nonlinear alternatives — opportunistic rules, regime-switching rules, and optimal rules derived from asymmetric loss functions — allow nonlinear policy responses to vary with the state of the economy.

== Alternative theories ==
The solvency rule was presented by Emiliano Brancaccio after the 2008 financial crisis. The banker follows a rule aimed at controlling the economy's solvency . The inflation target and output gap are neglected, while the interest rate is conditional upon the solvency of workers and firms. The solvency rule was presented more as a benchmark than a mechanistic formula.

The McCallum rule was offered by economist Bennett T. McCallum at the end of the 20th century. It targets the nominal gross domestic product. He proposed that the Fed stabilize nominal GDP. The McCallum rule uses precise financial data. Thus, it can overcome the problem of unobservable variables.

Market monetarism extended the idea of NGDP targeting to include level targeting (targeting a specific amount of growth per time period, and accelerating/decelerating growth to compensate for prior periods of weakness/strength). It also introduced the concept of targeting the forecast, such that policy is set to achieve the goal rather than merely to lean in one direction or the other. One proposed mechanism for assessing the impact of policy was to establish an NGDP futures market and use it to draw upon the insights of that market to direct policy.

== Empirical relevance ==
Although the Federal Reserve does not follow the Taylor rule, many analysts have argued that it provides a fairly accurate explanation of US monetary policy under Paul Volcker and Alan Greenspan and other developed economies. This observation has been cited by Clarida, Galí, and Gertler as a reason why inflation had remained under control and the economy had been relatively stable in most developed countries from the 1980s through the 2000s. However, according to Taylor, the rule was not followed in part of the 2000s, possibly inflating the housing bubble.

One line of research explores why deviations from the Taylor rule follow predictable patterns. Markets generally expect the Fed to adjust rates in response to inflation and output gaps, consistent with a Taylor-rule framework. Yet actual Fed decisions often surprise markets in ways that can be forecast ahead of time using financial variables like credit spreads and stock prices.

This predictability may arise because the Fed responds to broad financial conditions rather than to output and inflation directly. Under this view, the Fed watches how economic data gets absorbed into financial markets—through movements in stress indices and risk spreads—before deciding to act. Fed Chair Jerome Powell has acknowledged this approach, noting that the FOMC looks at "financial conditions very broadly" as "an important piece of information in assessing the likely path of the economy," though it does not target them directly. When markets expect immediate Taylor-rule responses to economic data but the Fed waits for that data to filter through financial conditions, predictable gaps emerge between expected and actual policy.

Some research has reported that households form expectations about the future path of interest rates, inflation, and unemployment in a way that is consistent with Taylor-type rules. Other show that monetary policy rule estimations may differ under limited information, involving different considerations in terms of central bank objectives and on the monetary policy rule types. Recent evidence also suggests that while Taylor rules successfully summarized the US Federal Reserve's systematic policies from 1965 to 2004, this relationship shifted afterward. Specifically, US systematic monetary policies between 2004 and 2019 are uniquely characterized by Monetary Feedback rules.

== Limitations ==
The Taylor rule is debated in the discourse of the rules vs. discretion. Limitations of the Taylor rule include.

- The 4-month period typically used is not accurate for tracking price changes and is too long for setting interest rates.
- The formula incorporates unobservable parameters that can be easily misevaluated. For example, the output gap cannot be precisely estimated.
- Forecasted variables such as the inflation and output gaps, are not accurate, depending on different scenarios of economic development.
- Difficult to assess the state of the economy early enough to adjust policy.
- The discretionary optimization that leads to stabilization bias and a lack of history dependence.
- The rule does not consider financial parameters. Even when financial parameters are considered, markets may still expect Taylor-rule responses to output and inflation while the Fed actually conditions its decisions on how those variables affect financial markets, leading to systematic forecast errors.
- The rule does not consider other policy instruments such as reserve funds adjustment or balance sheet policies.
- The relationship between the interest rate and aggregate demand.
- The specific formula is based on an implicit two percent target for the natural rate of interest. However, as Friedman had argued in December 1967, the central bank cannot know what the natural rate of interest and unemployment is, and hence should target a nominal variable.

Taylor highlighted that the rule should not be followed blindly: "…There will be episodes where monetary policy will need to be adjusted to deal with special factors."

== Criticisms ==
Athanasios Orphanides (2003) claimed that the Taylor rule can mislead policymakers who face real-time data. He claimed that the Taylor rule matches the US funds rate less perfectly when accounting for informational limitations and that an activist policy following the Taylor rule would have resulted in inferior macroeconomic performance during the 1970s.

In 2015, "Bond King" Bill Gross said the Taylor rule "must now be discarded into the trash bin of history", in light of tepid GDP growth in the years after 2009. Gross believed that low interest rates were not the cure for decreased growth, but the source of the problem.

== Practical applications ==
Taylor rule calculations for nine major central banks are maintained by the independent research project Central Bank Watch, which publishes the model-implied policy rate alongside the actual policy rate.

== See also ==
- Monetary policy
- Monetary policy reaction function
- Fisher effect
- McCallum rule
- Friedman's k-percent rule
- Golden Rule (growth)
- Inflation targeting
- Inverted yield curve
