= Cumulative process =

Cumulative process is a contribution to the economic theory of interest, proposed in Knut Wicksell's 1898 work, Interest and Prices. Wicksell made a key distinction between the natural rate of interest and the money rate of interest. The money rate of interest, to Wicksell, is the interest rate seen in the capital market; the natural rate of interest is the interest rate at which supply and demand in the market for goods are in equilibrium – as though there were no need for capital markets.

According to the idea of cumulative process, if the natural rate of interest was not equal to the market rate, demand for investment and quantity of savings would not be equal. If the market rate is beneath the natural rate, an economic expansion occurs and prices rise. The resulting inflation depresses the real interest rate and causes further expansion and further price increases.

The theory of the cumulative process of inflation is an early decisive swing at the idea of money as a "veil". Wicksell's process was much in line with the ideas of Henry Thornton's earlier work. Wicksell's theory claims, that increases in the supply of money lead to rises in price levels, but the original increase is endogenous, created by the conditions of the financial and real sectors.

With the existence of credit money, Wicksell claimed, two interest rates prevail: the "natural" rate and the "money" rate. The natural rate is the return on capital – or the real profit rate. It can be considered to be equivalent to the marginal product of new capital. The money rate, in turn, is the loan rate, an entirely financial construction. Credit, then, is perceived quite appropriately as "money". Banks provide credit, after all, by creating deposits upon which borrowers can draw. Since deposits constitute part of real money balances, therefore the bank can, in essence, "create" money.

Wicksell's main thesis, the disequilibrium engendered by real changes leads endogenously to an increase in the demand for money – and, simultaneously, its supply as banks try to accommodate it perfectly. Given full employment (a constant Y) and payments structure (constant V), then in terms of the equation of exchange, MV = PY, a rise in M leads only to a rise in P. Thus, the story of the Quantity theory of money, the long-run relationship between money and inflation, is kept in Wicksell. Wicksell's main thesis, the disequilibrium engendered by real changes leads endogenously to an increase in the demand for money – and, simultaneously, its supply as banks try to accommodate it perfectly.

Primarily, Say's law is violated and abandoned by the wayside. Namely, when real aggregate supply does constrain, inflation results because capital goods industries cannot meet new real demands for capital goods by entrepreneurs by increasing capacity. They may try but this would involve making higher bids in the factor market which itself is supply-constrained – thus raising factor prices and hence the price of goods in general. In short, inflation is a real phenomenon brought about by a rise in real aggregate demand over and above real aggregate supply.

For Wicksell, the creation of money, and how it leads to changes in the real market (i.e. increase real aggregate demand) is fundamentally a breakdown of the Neoclassical tradition of a dichotomy between monetary and real sectors. Money is not a "veil" – agents do react to it and this is not due to some irrational "money illusion". However, we should remind ourselves that, for Wicksell, in the long run, the Quantity theory still holds: money is still neutral in the long run, although to do so, Knut Wicksell has broken the Neoclassical principles of dichotomy, money supply exogeneity and Say's law.

"There is a certain rate of interest on loans which is neutral in respect to commodity prices, and tends neither to raise nor to lower them. This is necessarily the same as the rate of interest which would be determined by supply and demand if no use were made of money and all lending were effected in the form of real capital goods. It comes to much the same thing to describe it as the current value of the natural rate of interest on capital." Knut Wicksell – Interest and Prices, 1898, p. 102

== Sources ==
- Wicksell, K. ([1901]1934), Forelasningar I Nationalekonomi, Lund: Gleerups Forlag. English translation: Lectures on Political Economy, London: Routledge and Sons.
- Knut Wicksell – Interest and Prices, 1898 (pdf), Ludwig von Mises Institute, 2007
- Lars Pålsson Syll (2011). Ekonomisk doktrinhistoria (History of economic theories) (in Swedish). Studentlitteratur. p. 198. ISBN 91-44-06834-4, 9789144068343
- Boianovsky, Mauro, Erreygers, Guido (2005), Social comptabilism and pure credit systems. Solvay and Wicksell on monetary reform, in: Fontaine, Philippe, Leonard, Robert, (ed.), The experiment in the history of economics, London, Routledge.
- Michael Woodford (2003), Interest and Prices: Foundations of a Theory of Monetary Policy. Princeton University Press, ISBN 0-691-01049-8.
- Lars Jonung (1979), "Knut Wicksell's norm of price stabilization and Swedish monetary policy in the 1930s". Journal of Monetary Economics 5, pp. 45–496.
- Axel Leijonhufvud, The Wicksell Connection: Variation on a Theme. UCLA. November 1979.
- Gårdlund, Torsten (1990). Knut Wicksell: rebell i det nya riket (in Swedish) (New, [rev.] ed.). Stockholm: SNS. ISBN 91-7150-390-0. SELIBR 7609549.
