= Divine coincidence =

In economics, divine coincidence refers to the property of New Keynesian models that there is no trade-off between the stabilization of inflation and the stabilization of the welfare-relevant output gap (the gap between actual output and potential output) for central banks. This property is attributed to a feature of the model, namely the absence of real imperfections such as real wage rigidities. Conversely, if New Keynesian models are extended to account for these real imperfections, divine coincidence disappears and central banks again face a trade-off between inflation and output gap stabilization. The definition of divine coincidence is usually attributed to the seminal article by Olivier Blanchard and Jordi Galí in 2007.

== Model ==
In a standard New Keynesian model consisting of a Calvo price and sticky wages on the supply side and both a Keynes–Ramsey rule and the Taylor rule on the demand side, the so-called New Keynesian Phillips curve (NKPC) is the following:

$$\pi_{t} = \beta E_{t}[\pi_{t+1}] + \kappa (y_{t} - y_{t}^*) \,$$

where $\pi_{t}$ is current inflation, $E_{t}[\pi_{t+1}]$ is expected future inflation, $y_{t}$ is actual output, $y_{t}^*$ is natural output and $(y_{t} - y_{t}^*)$ is the welfare-relevant output gap. This equation implies that the two goals of maintaining inflation stable and stabilizing the output gap do not conflict: if, for example, an increase in oil price affects natural output, then holding inflation constant will make actual output equal natural output. This implication, or property, is called "divine coincidence".

The mechanism of how shocks affect the NKPC and how this results in divine coincidence was detailed by Greg Mankiw in 2005 for both aggregate demand shocks and productivity shocks: Expansionary (contractionary) demand shocks increase (decrease) prices and output above (below) potential. Because the covariance of price level and output gap is positive, a monetary policy stabilizing the price level tends to stabilize the output gap as well, thus isolating output from aggregate demand shocks. Positive productivity shocks depress prices and increase both actual and potential output, inciting a central bank targeting inflation to engage in expansionary monetary policy, which thereby further increases output. These two effects balance in many standard macroeconomic models, i.e. if the price level remains on target, both actual and potential output will increase by the same amount in response to a positive productivity shock.

Divine coincidence relies on the assumption specific to the New Keynesian model that the gap between the natural level of output and the efficient (first-best) level of output is constant and invariant to shocks. This further implies that stabilizing the output gap—the gap between actual and natural output—is equivalent to stabilizing the welfare-relevant output gap—the gap between actual and efficient output. If, however, non-trivial real imperfections are introduced into the model, the gap between natural and efficient output is not constant any more and is affected by shocks. Consequently, divine coincidence disappears, the output gap does not equal the welfare-relevant output gap any longer, and central banks are left with their trade-off between inflation and output stabilization.

Recently, it was shown that the divine coincidence does not necessarily hold in the non-linear form of the standard New-Keynesian model. This property would only hold if the monetary authority is set to keep the inflation rate at exactly 0%, which is the rate about which the linear form above is obtained as a first-order approximation of the non-linear model. At any other desired target for the inflation rate, there is an endogenous trade-off, even under no extra real imperfections such as sticky wages, and the divine coincidence no longer holds.

== Relevance ==
Many researchers, such as Blanchard, Galí or Mankiw appear skeptical with regard to the existence of divine coincidence in the real world. This skepticism is mostly directed to the severely restrictive assumptions required for divine coincidence to exist in the NKPC model, most prominently the absence of real wage rigidities. In the non-linear form of the standard New-Keynesian model, however, the absence of extra real rigidities is not a critical issue.

== Literature ==
- Blanchard, Olivier; Galí, Jordi (2007). "Real Wage Rigidities and the New Keynesian Model" (PDF). Journal of Money, Credit and Banking. 39 (1): 35–65. doi:10.1111/j.1538-4616.2007.00015.x.
- Blanchard, O. (2006). "Monetary Policy; Science or Art?" Paper presented at the ECB colloquium Monetary Policy: A Journey from Theory to Practice in March 2006.
