= Friedman rule =

Monetary policy rule proposed by Milton Friedman

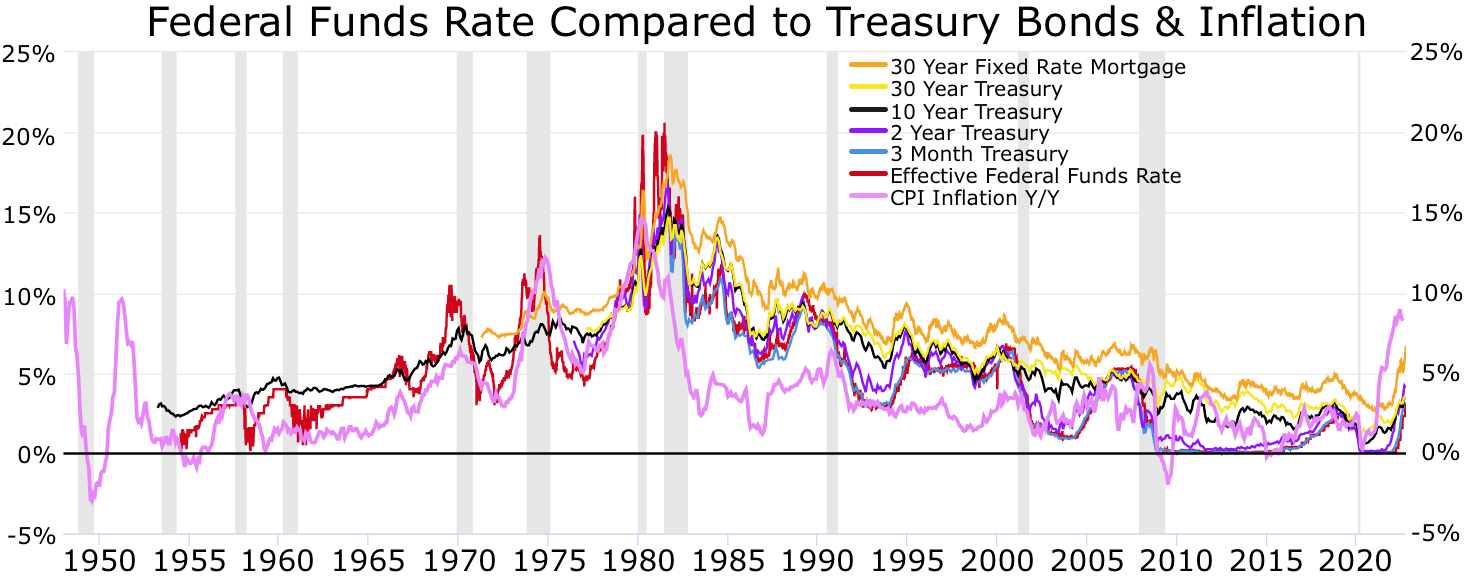
30 year mortgage average 30 Year Treasury Bond 10 Year Treasury Bond 2 Year Treasury Bond 3 month Treasury Bond Effective Federal Funds Rate CPI inflation year/year Recessions

The Friedman rule is a monetary policy rule proposed by Milton Friedman. Friedman advocated monetary policy that would result in the nominal interest rate being at or very near zero. His rationale was that the opportunity cost of holding money faced by private agents should equal the social cost of creating additional fiat money. Assuming that the marginal cost of creating additional money is zero (or approximated by zero), nominal rates of interest should also be zero. In practice, this means that a central bank should seek a rate of inflation or deflation equal to the real interest rate on government bonds and other safe assets, to make the nominal interest rate zero.

The result of this policy is that those who hold money do not suffer any loss in the value of that money due to inflation. The rule is motivated by long-run efficiency considerations.

This is not to be confused with Friedman's k-percent rule which advocates a constant yearly expansion of the monetary base.

== Friedman's argument ==
The marginal benefit of holding additional money is the decrease in transaction costs represented by (for example) costs associated with the purchase of consumption goods. With a positive nominal interest rate, people economise on their cash balances to the point that the marginal benefit (social and private) is equal to the marginal private cost (i.e., the nominal interest rate). This is not socially optimal, because the government can costlessly produce the cash until the supply is plentiful. A social optimum occurs when the nominal rate is zero (or deflation is at a rate equal to the real interest rate), so that the marginal social benefit and marginal social cost of holding money are equalized at zero. Thus, the Friedman rule is designed to remove an inefficiency, and by doing so, raise the mean of output.

== Use in economic theory ==
The Friedman rule has been shown to be the welfare maximizing monetary policy in many economic models of money. It has been shown to be optimal in monetary economies with monopolistic competition (Ireland, 1996) and, under certain circumstances, in a variety of monetary economies where the government levies other distorting taxes. However, there exist several notable cases where deviation from the Friedman rule becomes optimal. These include economies with decreasing returns to scale; economies with imperfect competition where the government does not either fully tax monopoly profits or set the tax equal to the labor income tax; economies with tax evasion; economies with sticky prices; and economies with downward nominal wage rigidity. While deviations from the Friedman rule are typically small, if there is a significant foreign demand for a nation's currency, such as in the United States, the optimal rate of inflation is found to deviate significantly from what is called for by Friedman rule in order to extract seigniorage revenue from foreign residents. In the case of the United States, where over half of all U.S. dollars are held overseas, the optimal rate of inflation is found to be anywhere from 2 to 10%, whereas the Friedman rule would call for deflation of almost 4%.

Recent results have also suggested that in order to achieve the goal of the Friedman rule, namely to reduce the opportunity cost and monetary frictions associated with money, it may not be required that the nominal interest rate be set at zero. When the effects of financial intermediaries and credit spreads are taken into account, the welfare optimality implied by the Friedman rule can instead be achieved by eliminating the interest rate differential between the policy nominal interest rate and the interest rate paid on reserves by assuring that the rates are identical at all times.

== Experimental evaluation ==
While no central bank has explicitly implemented the Friedman rule, experimental economists have evaluated the Friedman rule in a laboratory setting with paid human subjects. Contrary to theoretical predictions, the Friedman rule was not found to be welfare-improving, performing no better than a constant money supply regime. By one welfare measure, Friedman's k-percent rule performed best.

== See also ==
- Welfare cost of inflation
- Zero interest-rate policy
- Negative interest rate policy
- Money creation
