= Fisher equation =

Estimate of future interest rates

In financial mathematics and economics, the Fisher equation expresses the relationship between nominal interest rates, real interest rates, and inflation. Named after Irving Fisher, an American economist, it can be expressed as real interest rate ≈ nominal interest rate − inflation rate.

In more formal terms, where $r$ equals the real interest rate, $i$ equals the nominal interest rate, and $\pi$ equals the inflation rate, then $(1 + i) = (1 + r) (1 + \pi)$. Since the $r\pi$ is negligible the approximation $r = i - \pi$ is often used instead since the nominal interest rate, real interest rate, and inflation rate are usually close to zero. The form $r = \frac{1+i}{1 + \pi}-1$ is also common.

== Applications ==
=== Borrowing, lending and the time value of money ===
When loans are made, the amount borrowed and the repayments due to the lender are normally stated in nominal terms, before inflation. However, when inflation occurs, a dollar repaid in the future is worth less than a dollar borrowed today. To calculate the true economics of the loan, it is necessary to adjust the nominal cash flows to account for future inflation.

=== Inflation-indexed bonds ===
The Fisher equation can be used in the analysis of bonds. The real return on a bond is roughly equivalent to the nominal interest rate minus the expected inflation rate. But if actual inflation exceeds expected inflation during the life of the bond, the bondholder's real return will suffer. This risk is one of the reasons inflation-indexed bonds such as U.S. Treasury Inflation-Protected Securities were created to eliminate inflation uncertainty. Holders of indexed bonds are assured that the real cash flow of the bond (principal plus interest) will not be affected by inflation.

=== Cost–benefit analysis ===
As detailed by Steve Hanke, Philip Carver, and Paul Bugg (1975), cost benefit analysis can be greatly distorted if the exact Fisher equation is not applied. Prices and interest rates must both be projected in either real or nominal terms.

=== Monetary policy ===
The Fisher equation plays a key role in the Fisher hypothesis, which asserts that the real interest rate is unaffected by monetary policy and hence unaffected by the expected inflation rate. With a fixed real interest rate, a given percent change in the expected inflation rate will, according to the equation, necessarily be met with an equal percent change in the nominal interest rate in the same direction.

== See also ==
- Real versus nominal value (economics)
- Yield
- Yield curve
- Interest rate
- Inflation
