= Friedman's k-percent rule =

Economic policy regarding increases to the money supply

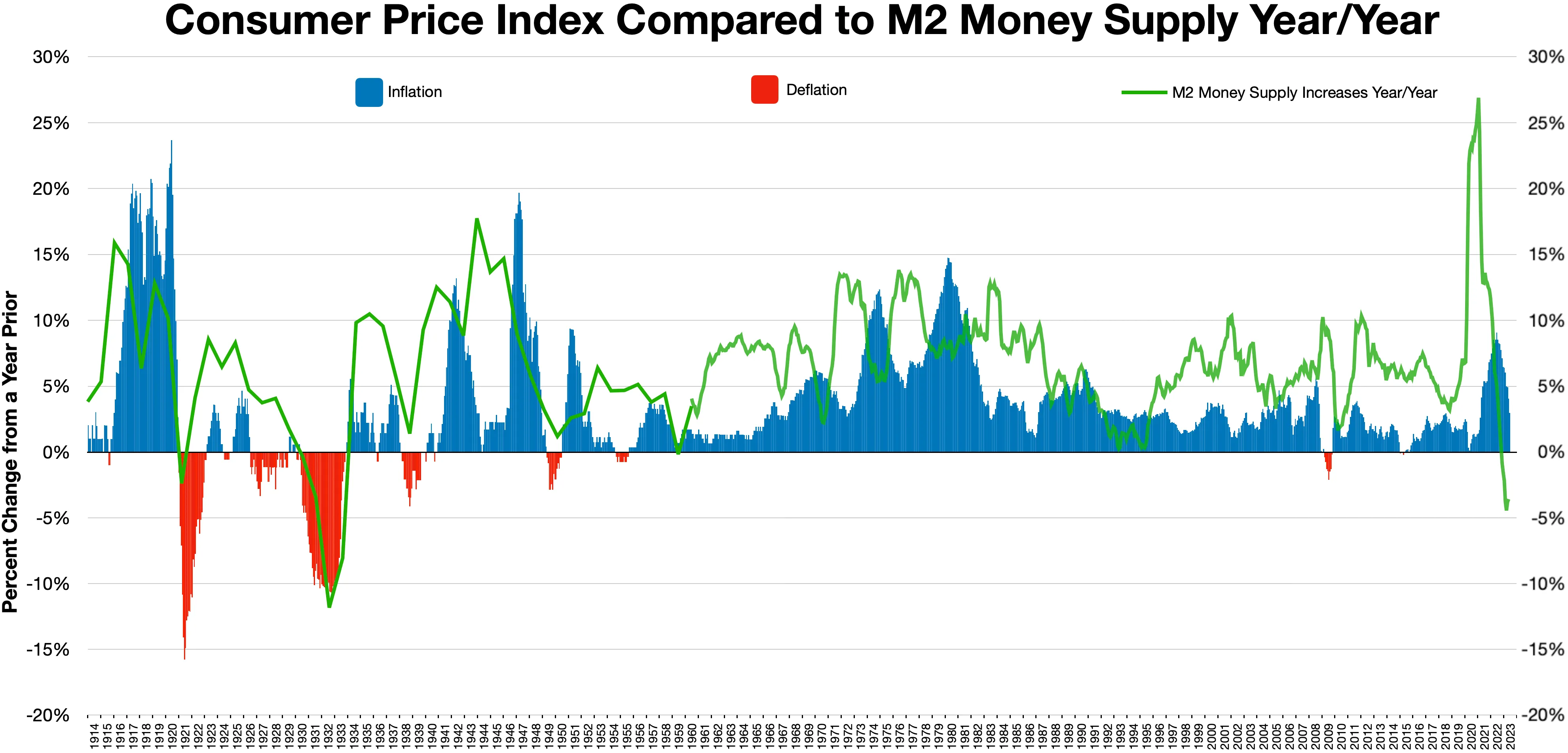
Inflation Deflation M2 money supply increases Year/Year

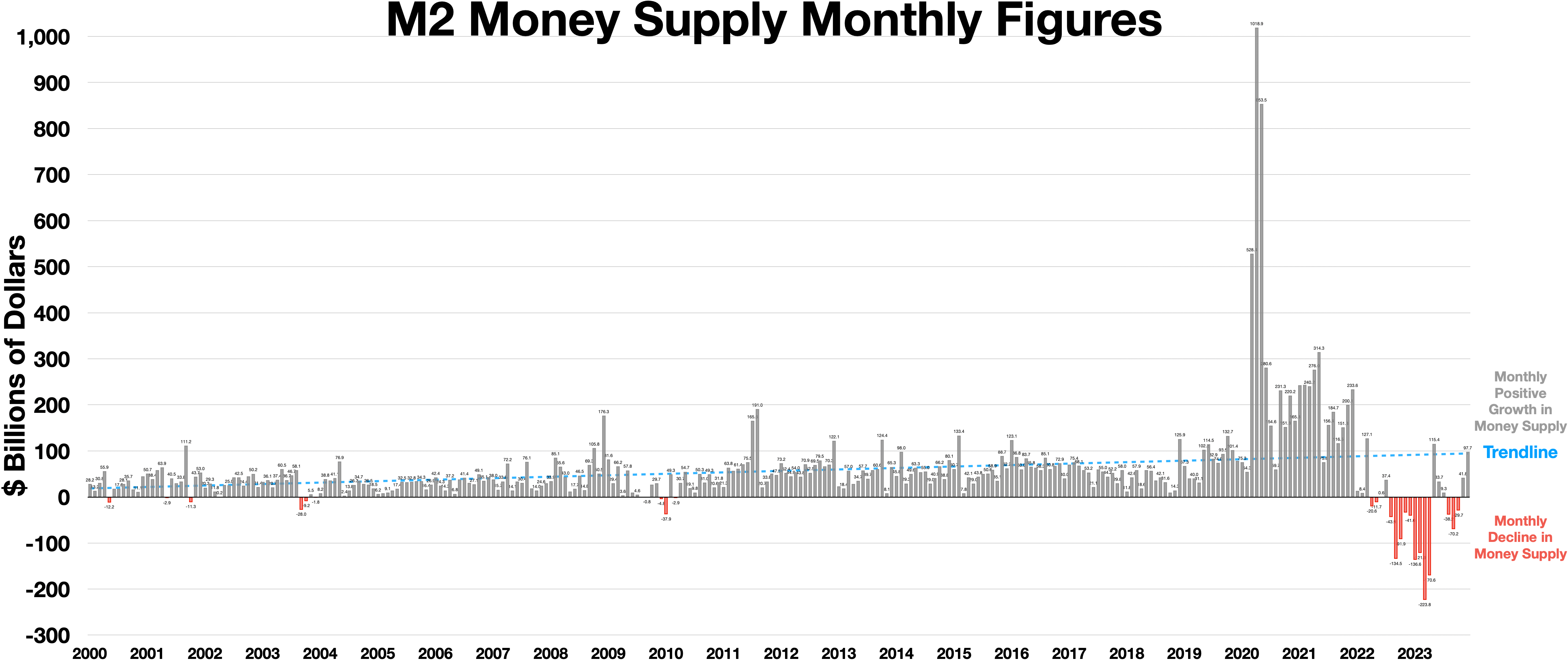
M2 money supply monthly figures. Trend-line M2 monthly increases is ~$100 billion at the end of 2023. Trend-line

In macroeconomics, Friedman's k-percent rule (named for Milton Friedman) is the monetarist proposal that the money supply should be increased by the central bank by a constant percentage rate every year, irrespective of business cycles.

== Definition ==
According to Milton Friedman "The stock of money [should be] increased at a fixed rate year-in and year-out without any variation in the rate of increase to meet cyclical needs." (Friedman 1960) Giving governments any flexibility in setting money growth will lead to inflation according to Friedman. The main policy to be avoided is countercyclical monetary policy, the standard Keynesian policy recommendation at the time. For this reason, the central bank should be forced to expand the money supply at a constant rate, equivalent to the rate of growth of real GDP.

This is not to be confused with the Friedman rule, which is a policy of zero nominal interest rates.

== See also ==
- Taylor rule
- Inflation targeting
- Inverted yield curve
- McCallum rule
- NDGP Targeting
- Money creation
