= Jordi Galí =

Catalan economist

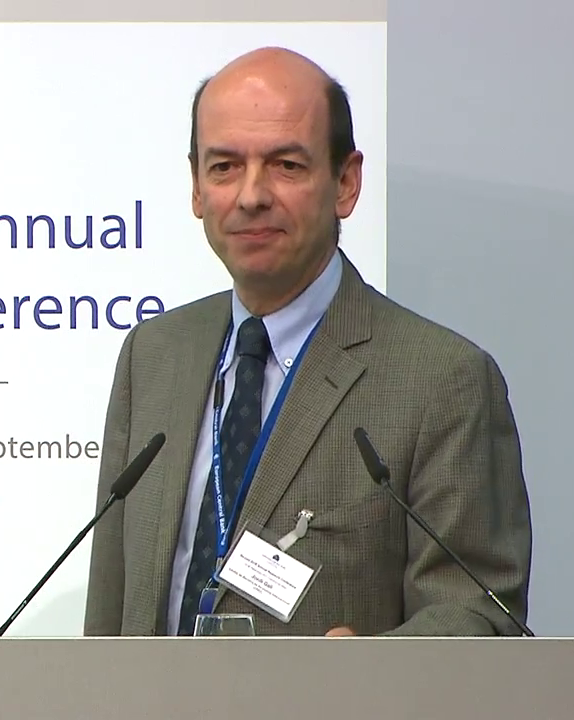
- Galí in 2017
- Born: January 4, 1961 (age 65); Barcelona, Spain

Academic background
- Education: MIT (Ph.D. 1989)
- Doctoral advisor: Olivier Blanchard
- Influences: Mark Gertler

Academic work
- Discipline: Macroeconomics
- School or tradition: New Keynesian economics
- Institutions: Universitat Pompeu Fabra (2001–); CREI (1999–); Barcelona Graduate School of Economics (2006–); New York University (1994–01); Columbia University (1989–94)
- Awards: Yrjö Jahnsson Award (2005)
- Website: Information at IDEAS / RePEc

Jordi Galí (born January 4, 1961) is a Catalan macroeconomist who is regarded as one of the main figures in New Keynesian macroeconomics today. He is a Senior Researcher at the Centre de Recerca en Economia Internacional (CREI), a Professor at Universitat Pompeu Fabra and a Research Professor at the Barcelona School of Economics. After obtaining his doctorate from MIT in 1989 under the supervision of Olivier Blanchard, he held faculty positions at Columbia University and New York University before moving to Barcelona.

== Research contributions ==
Galí's research centers on the causes of business cycles and on optimal monetary policy, especially through the lens of time series analysis. His studies with Richard Clarida and Mark Gertler suggest that monetary policy in many countries today resembles the Taylor rule, whereas the policy makers of the 1970s failed to follow the Taylor rule.

Another theme of Galí's research is how central banks should set interest rates. In some of the simplest New Keynesian macroeconomic models, stabilizing the inflation rate stabilizes the output gap too. If this property were roughly true in reality, it would permit central bankers to pursue a simplified Taylor rule focused only on inflation stabilization, with no need to consider output growth. Jordi Galí and Olivier Blanchard have called this property the 'divine coincidence', and have argued that in more realistic models which include additional frictions, it no longer holds. Instead, models with additional frictions (such as frictional unemployment) imply a tradeoff between stabilizing inflation and stabilizing the output gap.

Galí is perhaps best known for providing time series evidence that improvements in labour productivity cause employment to decrease. This finding contradicts the predictions of some well-known real business cycle models promoted by the New Classical macroeconomic school, but is (according to Galí) consistent with many New Keynesian models. However, the statistical methods ('structural vector autoregressions') on which this finding is based remain controversial.

Galí is the most cited author of Journal of Monetary Economics and European Economic Review.

== Books ==
In 2008, Princeton University Press published Galí's monograph Monetary Policy, Inflation, and the Business Cycle. The book provides an introduction to New Keynesian DSGE models, and analyzes the implications of those models for monetary policy. It is written at a level intended for introductory graduate courses in macroeconomics. A second edition was published in 2015.

== Awards ==
In 2005, Galí received the Yrjö Jahnsson Award of the European Economic Association, of which he is also a fellow, in recognition of his work on New Keynesian macroeconomics. He shared the prize with Timothy Besley of the London School of Economics. Thomson Reuters lists him among the 'citation laureates' who are likely future winners of the Nobel Prize in Economics. For 2024 he was awarded the BBVA Foundation Frontiers of Knowledge Award in the category of "Economics and Finance".

He was elected a member of the Academia Europaea in 2012.

== See also ==
- Barcelona Graduate School of Economics
