= Sven Dag Wicksell =

Swedish academic (1890–1939)

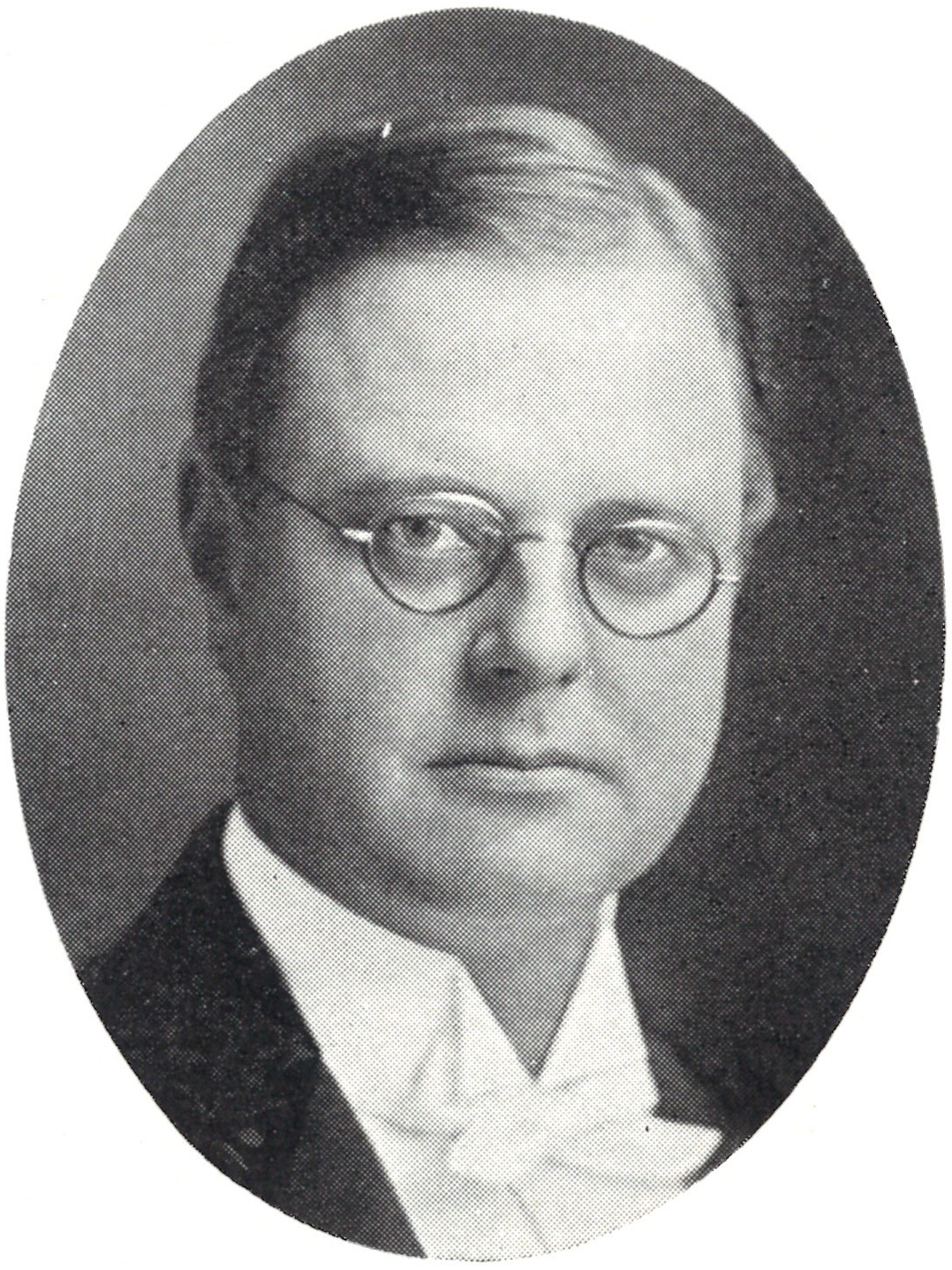
Sven Wicksell.

Sven Dag Wicksell (22 October 1890, Stockholm – 20 February 1939, Lund) was a Swedish professor of statistics at Lund University.

== Biography ==
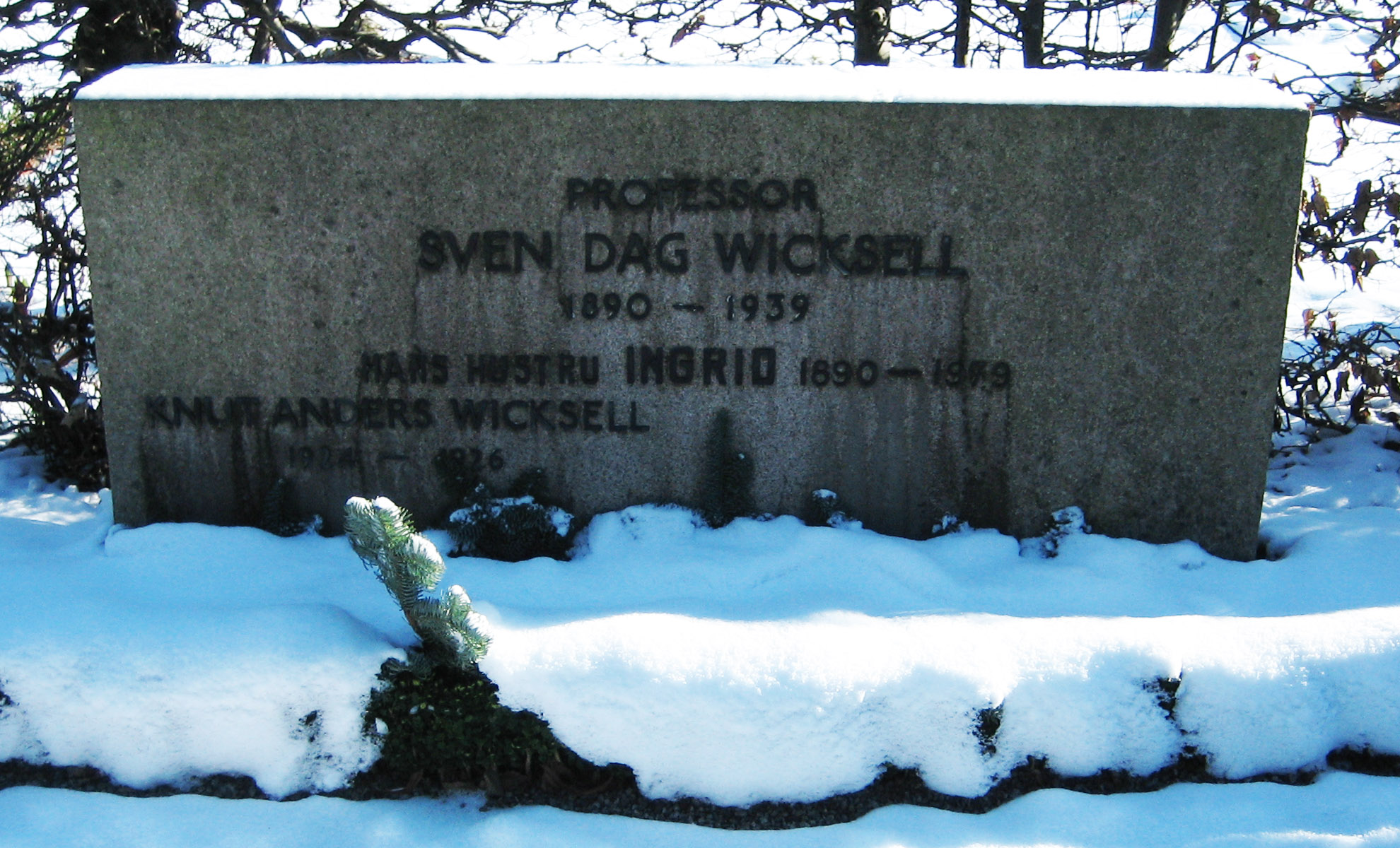
Sven Wicksell's grave at North Cemetery in Lund

In 1915 he received his Ph.D. (promotion), with supervisor Carl Charlier, from Lund University. There Wicksell became in 1915 a docent (lecturer) and in 1926 Lund University's first professor of statistics, a professorial chair that was created thanks to Wicksell's mentor Charlier. Wicksell did research on mathematical statistics, astronomical statistics and demographics. Upon his death in 1939, his professorial chair remained vacant until 1941 when Carl-Erik Quensel became his successor.

In 1928 Wicksell was an Invited Speaker at the ICM in Bologna. He was elected in 1939 as member number 870 of Kungliga Vetenskapsakademien.

His parents were the economist Knut Wicksell and the feminist Anna Bugge. Sven Wicksell was married from 1913 to Ingrid Anderson (1890–1979), daughter of a grain merchant. Their son Finn Wicksell became a prominent obstetrician and gynecologist.

== Selected works ==
- Wicksell, Sven D. (1915). "The general characteristics of the frequency function of stellar movements as derived from the proper motions of the stars". Meddelanden Fran Lunds Astronomiska Observatorium Serie II. 12: 5–94. Bibcode:1915MeLuS..12....5W.
- Wicksell, S. D. (1916). "Some theorems in the theory of probability, with special reference to their importance in the theory of homograde correlation". Meddelanden Fran Lunds Astronomiska Observatorium Serie I. 74: 1–49. Bibcode:1916MeLuF..74....1W.
- Wicksell, S.D. (1917). "XXXIX. The application of solid hypergeometrical series to frequency distributions in space". The London, Edinburgh, and Dublin Philosophical Magazine and Journal of Science. 33 (197): 389–394. doi:10.1080/14786440508635654.
- Wicksell, S. D. (1917). "The construction of the curves of equal frequency in case of type A correlation". Meddelanden Fran Lunds Astronomiska Observatorium Serie I. 80: 1–19. Bibcode:1917MeLuF..80....1C.
- Wicksell, S. D. (1918). "On the correlation of acting probabilities". Scandinavian Actuarial Journal. 1918 (1): 98–135. Bibcode:1918MeLuF..85....1W. doi:10.1080/03461238.1918.10405303.
- Wicksell, S. D. (1919). "Multiple correlation and non-linear regression". Meddelanden Fran Lunds Astronomiska Observatorium Serie I. 91: 1–18. Bibcode:1919MeLuF..91....1W.
- Wicksell, S.D. (1919). "XXXVII. A general formula for the moments of the normal correlation function of any number of variates". The London, Edinburgh, and Dublin Philosophical Magazine and Journal of Science. 37 (220): 446–452. doi:10.1080/14786440408635900.
- Wicksell, S. D. (1922). "Contributions to the analytical theory of sampling". Meddelanden Fran Lunds Astronomiska Observatorium Serie I. 102: 1–46. Bibcode:1922MeLuF.102....1W.
- with Carl Vilhelm Ludwig Charlier: Charlier, C. V. L.; Wicksell, S. D. (1923). "On the dissection of frequency functions". Meddelanden Fran Lunds Astronomiska Observatorium Serie I. 103: 1–64. Bibcode:1923MeLuF.103....1C.
- Wicksell, S. D. (1924). "A study of the properties of globular distributions". Meddelanden Fran Lunds Astronomiska Observatorium Serie I. 104: 1–16. Bibcode:1924MeLuF.104....1W.
- Wicksell, S. D. (1925). "The corpuscle problem: a mathematical study of a biometric problem". Biometrika. 17 (1/2): 84–99. doi:10.2307/2332027. JSTOR 2332027.
- Wicksell, S. D. (1926). "The corpuscle problem: second memoir: case of ellipsoidal corpuscles". Biometrika. 18 (1/2): 151–172. doi:10.2307/2332500. JSTOR 2332500.
- Wicksell, S. D. (1926). "Sex proportion and parental age: A new investigation into the old problem of relation between the sex of children and the ages of their parents." Meddelanden fran Lunds Astronomiska Observatorium Serie II". Meddelanden Fran Lunds Astronomiska Observatorium Serie II. 42: 3–86. Bibcode:1926MeLuS..42....3W.
- Wicksell, S.D. (1931). "Nuptiality, fertility, and reproductivity". Scandinavian Actuarial Journal. 1931 (3): 125–157. doi:10.1080/03461238.1931.10405858.
- Wicksell, S. D. (1933). "On correlation functions of type III". Biometrika. 25 (1/2): 121–133. doi:10.2307/2332267. JSTOR 2332267.
- Wicksell, S. D. (1934). "Analytical theory of regression". Meddelanden Fran Lunds Astronomiska Observatorium Serie II. 69: 3–32. Bibcode:1934MeLuS..69....3W.
