= Wicksell's theory of capital =

Named after Swedish economist Knut Wicksell (1851-1926), Wicksell's theory of capital examines factor prices as derived from the value of the marginal product.

Wicksell pointed out that in an equilibrium situation, the interest rate would exceed the value of the marginal product of capital because the aggregate stock of capital would be revalued due to changes in the interest rate.
