= Wicksell effect =

Economic terminology

The Wicksell effect is the combination of a price effect and a real effect on the valuation of changes in the capital stock. Swedish Economist Knut Wicksell (1851 – 1926) used the Austrian analytic framework to discuss the effect.

An important implication of the effect is that the valuation of the capital stock is extremely problematic in all realistic situations. The price effect involves a reevaluation of the inventory of capital goods due to new prices. The real effect due to the price weighted sum of changes in the physical quantities of different capital goods. The term itself was introduced by Uhr (1951) and its importance noted by both Joan Robinson (1956) and Trevor Swan (1956).

There is a difference between "Price Wicksell effect" and "Real Wicksell effect". A price Wicksell effect refers to a change in relative prices corresponding to a change in income distribution, given the system of production in use. A real Wicksell effect also refers to a change in relative prices corresponding to a change in income distribution, but it in addition takes into account the problem of choice of technique. The "changes" under consideration are comparisons of long period equilibria.

== See also ==
- Cambridge capital controversy
