= Bennett McCallum =

American economist (1935–2022)

Bennett T. McCallum
- Born: July 27, 1935; Poteet, Texas
- Died: December 28, 2022 (aged 87); Charlottesville, Virginia

Academic background
- Education: Rice University; Harvard University
- Influences: John Muth; Robert E. Lucas

Academic work
- Discipline: Monetary economics Econometrics
- School or tradition: New classical economics
- Institutions: Carnegie Mellon University; University of Virginia
- Notable ideas: McCallum rule
- Website: Information at IDEAS / RePEc

Bennett Tarlton McCallum (July 27, 1935 – December 28, 2022) was an American monetary economist. He was H. J. Heinz Professor of Economics at Carnegie Mellon University's Tepper School of Business. He is known for the McCallum Rule, a monetary policy proposal advocating targeting the growth rate of the monetary base.

McCallum earned a B.A. and a B.Sc. (in chemical engineering) from Rice University. He then attended Harvard Business School to earn his M.B.A., before returning to Rice in order to obtain his Ph.D. in economics.

He became professor at Carnegie Mellon in 1981, after holding a professorship at the University of Virginia (1974–1982). Among his doctoral students was Charles L. Evans, who was president of the Federal Reserve Bank of Chicago from 2007 to 2023.

== See also ==
- McCallum rule
