= Market mechanism =

Economic phenomenon

In economics, the market mechanism is a mechanism by which the use of money exchanged by buyers and sellers with an open and understood system of value and time trade-offs in a market tends to optimize distribution of goods and services in at least some ways. The mechanism can exist in free markets or in captive or controlling markets seek to use supply and demand, or some other form of charging for scarcity, to choose among production possibilities. In a free market economy, all the resources are allocated by the private sector (individuals, households, and groups of individuals); in a planned economy, all the resources are owned by the public sector (local and central government); and, in a mixed economy, some resources are owned by both sectors, private and public. Resources are allocated according to the forces of supply and demand.

Government interference in the market mechanism can lead to economic inefficiency when it is applied to some private goods. Prices convey a lot of information. They not only tell producers what to produce but also inform the producers to produce what people want. The more inaccurate the information gets, the lesser will be the economic coordination which will in turn lower satisfaction of wants. Thus interference in the information conveyed by prices is destructive to economic development if misapplied or overused. However, the market mechanism often cannot optimize for public goods, owing to problems such as the tragedy of the commons. For example, modern highways have been good for economic development, but it has taken government planning and allocation to bring them into existence.

Other market mechanisms include government fiscal policy and monetary policy, described by the Friedman rule proposed by Milton Friedman. These policies will influence demand by price adjustments through taxes and charges and through adjustments to the value of money by the related supply of money.

== See also ==
- Capitalism
- Price mechanism
