= Neutral rate of interest =

Economic variable

The neutral or natural rate of interest, also called r-star (r*), is the real (net of inflation) interest rate that supports the economy at full employment/maximum output while keeping inflation constant. It cannot be observed directly. Rather, policy makers and economic researchers aim to estimate the neutral rate of interest as a guide to monetary policy, usually using various economic models to help them do so.

== History ==
Eugen von Böhm-Bawerk used the term "natural interest" in his Capital and Interest first written in 1880s, but the concept itself was originated by the Swedish economist Knut Wicksell. Wicksell published a study in 1898 defining the natural rate of interest as the rate that would bring an economy in aggregate price equilibrium if all lending were done without reference to money. Wicksell defined the natural rate of interest as "a certain rate of interest on loans which is neutral in respect to commodity prices and tends neither to raise nor to lower them".

Following Wicksell, J. M. Keynes introduced the term "natural rate of interest" in his A Treatise on Money (1930).

No further significant work on the idea of a natural rate of interest followed, partly because Wicksell's study was originally published in German and did not become easily available in English until 1936. Further, at the time, central banks were not targeting interest rates. The level of interest rates was not a main focus of policy attention.

When during the 1990s the central bank policy targets started changing, the concept began attracting renewed attention, and the term "neutral rate" gradually replaced "natural rate". The US Federal Reserve decision to adopt the short term interest rate as its primary control of inflation led to growing research interest into the topic of the neutral rate of interest. Using macroeconomic models, the neutral rate of interest can be defined as that rate of interest where the IS curve intersects with the potential output line (a vertical line cutting the X-axis at the value of potential GDP).

== Recent discussion ==
A good deal of recent discussion about economic policy, both in the US and internationally, has centered on the idea of the neutral rate of interest. Following the 2008 financial crisis, key central banks in major countries around the world expanded liquidity quickly and encouraged interest rates (especially short-term interest rates) to move to very low levels. This approach led to much discussion among economic policy makers as to what the appropriate levels of interest rates (both in the short-term, and in the long-term) might be. In 2017, for example, analysts in the Canadian central bank, the Bank of Canada, argued that the neutral rate of interest in Canada had declined significantly following the 2008 financial crisis. The long-term decline of the neutral rate of interest in the US has been analysed in a study prepared for the 2021 Jackson Hole Economic Symposium hosted by the Federal Reserve Bank of Kansas City.

== R-star ==
Among economic policy makers, in official and academic papers, the natural rate of interest is often depicted as r* ("r-star").

R-star (the natural rate of interest) is of particular interest because key economic issues for economic policy makers, at any time, revolve around the relationship between current long-term interest rates and r-star. Questions arise, for example, as to whether current rates are below or above r-star, and if there is a significant gap between current rates and r-star, how quickly the gap should be closed. Broader issues also attract much debate, such as whether the global natural rate of interest ("global r-star") is stable or whether it is tending to drift up or down over time – and if it is tending to drift, what are the underlying factors (economic, social, demographic) that are causing the change.

Williams has argued that it is increasingly clear that global r* has declined in recent years:

The evidence of a sizable decline in r-star across economies is compelling. The weighted average of estimates for five major economic areas—Canada, the euro area, Japan, the United Kingdom, and the United States—has declined to half a percent. That’s 2 percentage points below the average natural rate that prevailed in the two decades before the financial crisis. A striking aspect of these estimates is that they show no signs of moving back to previously normal levels, even though economies have recovered from the crisis. Given the demographic waves and sustained productivity growth slowdown around the world, I see no reason to expect r-star to revert to higher levels in the foreseeable future. ... The global decline in r-star will continue to pose significant challenges for monetary policy.

== Other "star" variables ==
Senior economic policy makers and other economists often discuss the level of the natural rate of interest (r-star) in relation to several other key economic variables, sometimes also seen as "stars". In August 2018, the Chairman of the United States Federal Reserve System (the "Fed"), Jay Powell, discussed the relationships between several of these main variables in some detail. Powell noted that the natural rate of interest needed to be considered in relation to the "natural rate of unemployment" (which Powell noted is often referred to as "u-star", written u*) and the inflation objective ("pi-star", written Π*). Powell then went on to note that the conventional approach to economic policy making was that "policymakers should navigate by these stars". However, he said, although navigating by the stars can sound straightforward, in practice "guiding policy by the stars ... has been quite challenging of late because our best estimates of the location of the stars have been changing significantly". Powell reviewed the history of attempts to estimate the location of the "stars" over a 40-year period 1960–2000 and noted that over time, there had been significant revisions of estimates of the positions of the stars.

== Variations between countries ==
Estimates of the neutral rate of interest vary between countries. This is because the underlying factors influencing the neutral rate of interest are believed to vary between countries. Estimates of the natural rate of interest in Australia carried out in 2017 in the Reserve Bank of Australia, for example, suggest that the natural rate of interest in Australia is perhaps somewhat higher than in the US/Euro area.
