= Monetary policy reaction function =

A monetary policy reaction function describes how a central bank systematically adjusts its policy instruments in response to changes in economic conditions. This function provides a framework for understanding how central banks make policy decisions based on observable economic indicators.

== Examples ==
The most influential reaction function is the Taylor rule, developed by economist John Taylor in 1993. The rule provides a systematic formula for setting the nominal interest rate based on four key variables: The deviation of current inflation rate from the central bank's target; The current inflation rate itself; The equilibrium real interest rate; and the output gap, measured as the percentage difference between actual GDP and potential output.

An alternative formulation of the monetary policy reaction function was proposed by Ben Bernanke and Robert H. Frank. Their simplified version describes a positive relationship between the real interest rate and the inflation rate, where central banks respond to rising inflation by increasing real interest rates:

r = r* + g(π – π*)

where

r = current target real interest rate
r* = long-run target for the real interest rate
g = constant term (or the slope of the MPRF)
π = actual inflation rate
π* = long-run target for the inflation rate

This linear relationship provides a more straightforward framework compared to the multi-variable Taylor rule, though it captures fewer economic factors.
