= Real interest rate =

Interest rate taking inflation into account

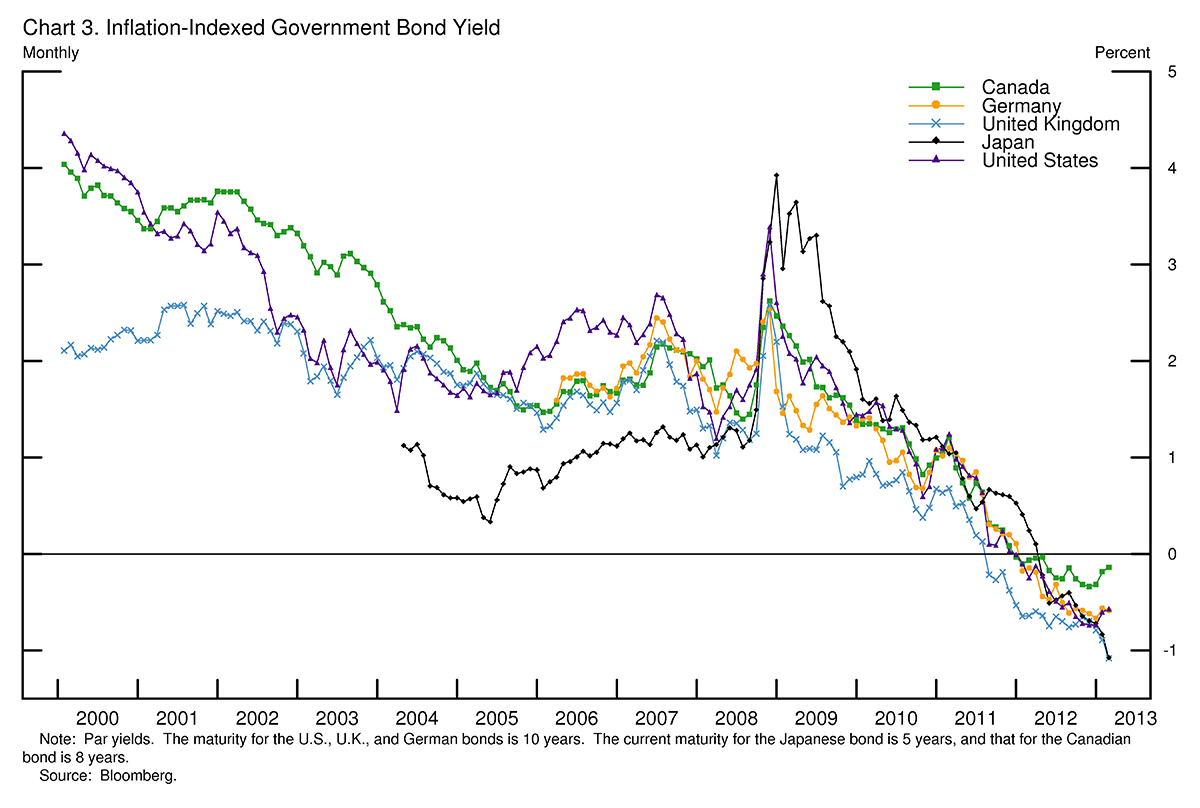
Yields on inflation-indexed government bonds of selected countries and maturities.

The real interest rate is the rate of interest an investor, saver or lender receives (or expects to receive) after allowing for inflation. It can be described more formally by the Fisher equation, which states that the real interest rate is approximately the nominal interest rate minus the inflation rate.

If, for example, an investor were able to lock in a 5% interest rate for the coming year and anticipated a 2% rise in prices, they would expect to earn a real interest rate of 3%. The expected real interest rate is not a single number, as different investors have different expectations of future inflation. Since the inflation rate over the course of a loan is not known initially, volatility in inflation represents a risk to both the lender and the borrower.

In the case of contracts stated in terms of the nominal interest rate, the real interest rate is known only at the end of the period of the loan, based on the realized inflation rate; this is called the ex-post real interest rate. Since the introduction of inflation-indexed bonds, ex-ante real interest rates have become observable.

== Compensation for lending ==
An individual who lends money for repayment at a later point in time expects to be compensated for the time value of money, or not having the use of that money while it is lent. In addition, they will want to be compensated for the expected value of the loss of purchasing power when the loan is repaid. These expected losses include the possibility that the borrower will default or be unable to pay on the originally agreed upon terms, or that collateral backing the loan will prove to be less valuable than estimated; the possibility of changes in taxation and regulatory changes which would prevent the lender from collecting on a loan or having to pay more in taxes on the amount repaid than originally estimated; and the loss of buying power compared to the money originally lent, due to inflation.

Nominal interest rates measure the sum of the compensations for all three sources of loss, plus the time value of the money itself.
Real interest rates measure the compensation for expected losses due to default and regulatory changes as well as measuring the time value of money; they differ from nominal rates of interest by excluding the inflation compensation component.

On an economy-wide basis, the "real interest rate" in an economy is often considered to be the rate of return on a risk-free investment, such as US Treasury notes, minus an index of inflation, such as the rate of change of the CPI or GDP deflator.

=== Fisher equation ===
The relation between real and nominal interest rates and the expected inflation rate is given by the Fisher equation

$$1+i = (1+r) (1+\pi_e)$$

where

i = nominal interest rate;
r = real interest rate;
$\pi_e$ = expected inflation rate.

For example, if somebody lends $1000 for a year at 10%, and receives $1100 back at the end of the year, this represents a 10% increase in her purchasing power if prices for the average goods and services that she buys are unchanged from what they were at the beginning of the year. However, if the prices of the food, clothing, housing, and other things that she wishes to purchase have increased 25% over this period, she has, in fact, suffered a real loss of about 15% in her purchasing power. (Notice that the approximation here is a bit rough; since 1.1/1.25 - 1 = 0.88 - 1 = -.12, the actual loss of purchasing power is exactly 12%.)

If the inflation rate and the nominal interest are relatively low, the Fisher equation can be approximated by

$$r=i-\pi_e.$$

=== After-tax real interest rate ===
The real return actually gained by a lender is lower if there is a non-zero tax rate imposed on interest earnings. Generally taxes are imposed on nominal interest earnings, not adjusted for inflation. If the tax rate is denoted as t, the before-tax nominal earning rate is i, the amount of taxes paid (per dollar or other unit invested) is i × t, and so the after-tax nominal earning is i × (1–t ). Hence the expected after-tax real return to the investor, using the simplified approximate Fisher equation above, is given by

Expected real after-tax return = $i(1-t) - \pi_e.$

=== Variations in inflation ===
The inflation rate will not be known in advance. People often base their expectation of future inflation on an average of inflation rates in the past, but this gives rise to errors. The real interest rate ex-post may turn out to be quite different from the real interest rate (ex-ante real interest rate) that was expected in advance. Borrowers hope to repay in cheaper money in the future, while lenders hope to collect on more expensive money. When inflation and currency risks are underestimated by lenders, then they will suffer a net reduction in buying power.

The complexity increases for bonds issued for a long-term, where the average inflation rate over the term of the loan may be subject to a great deal of uncertainty. In response to this, many governments have issued real return bonds, also known as inflation-indexed bonds, in which the principal value and coupon rises each year with the rate of inflation, with the result that the interest rate on the bond approximates a real interest rate. (E.g., the three-month indexation lag of TIPS can result in a divergence of as much as 0.042% from the real interest rate, according to research by Grishchenko and Huang.) In the US, Treasury Inflation Protected Securities (TIPS) are issued by the US Treasury.

The expected real interest rate can vary considerably from year to year. The real interest rate on short-term loans is strongly influenced by the monetary policy of central banks. The real interest rate on longer term bonds tends to be more market driven, and in recent decades, with globalized financial markets, the real interest rates in the industrialized countries have become increasingly correlated. Real interest rates have been low by historical standards since 2000, due to a combination of factors, including relatively weak demand for loans by corporations, plus strong savings in newly industrializing countries in Asia. The latter has offset the large borrowing demands by the US Federal Government, which might otherwise have put more upward pressure on real interest rates.

Related is the concept of "risk return", which is the rate of return minus the risks as measured against the safest (least-risky) investment available. Thus if a loan is made at 15% with an inflation rate of 5% and 10% in risks associated with default or problems repaying, then the "risk adjusted" rate of return on the investment is 0%.

== Importance in economic theory ==
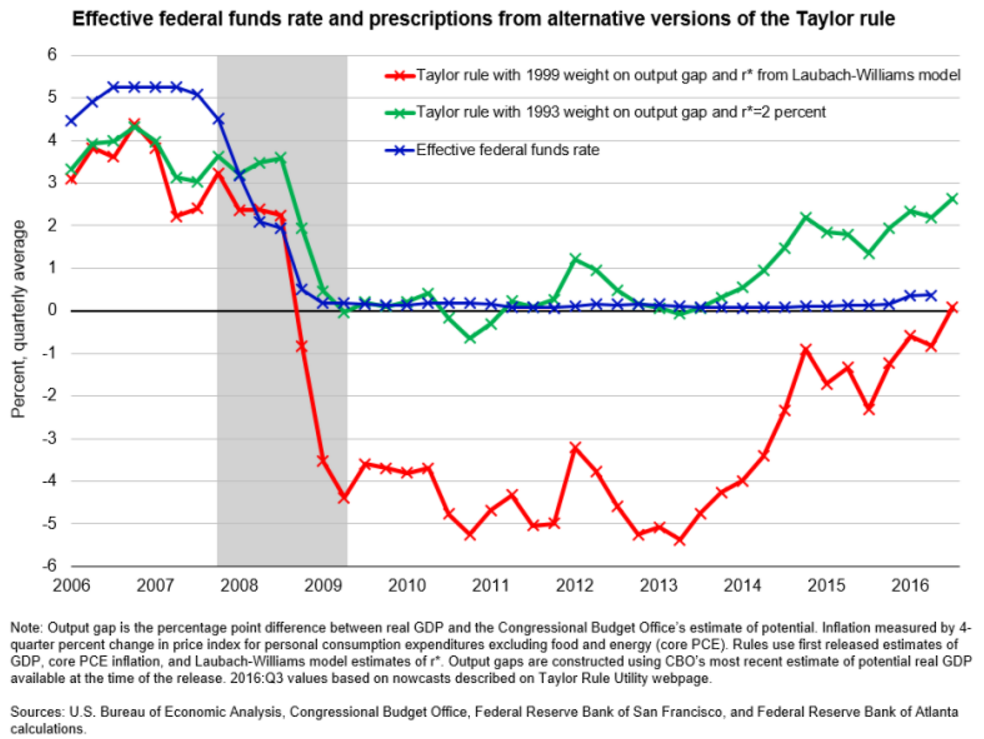
Effective federal funds rate and prescriptions from alternate versions of the Taylor Rule

The amount of physical investment—in particular the purchasing of new machines and other productive capacity—that firms engage in partially depends on the level of real interest rates because such purchases typically must be financed by issuing new bonds. If real interest rates are high, the cost of borrowing may exceed the real physical return of some potentially purchased machines (in the form of output produced); in that case those machines will not be purchased. Lower real interest rates would make it profitable to borrow to finance the purchasing of a greater number of machines.

The real interest rate is used in various economic theories to explain such phenomena as capital flight, business cycles and economic bubbles. When the real rate of interest is high, because demand for credit is high, then the usage of income will, all other things being equal, move from consumption to saving, and physical investment will fall. Conversely, when the real rate of interest is low, income usage will move from saving to consumption, and physical investment will rise. Different economic theories, beginning with the work of Knut Wicksell, have had different explanations of the effect of rising and falling real interest rates. Thus—assuming risks are constant—international capital moves to markets that offer higher real rates of interest from markets that offer low or negative real rates of interest. Capital flows of this kind often reflect speculation in financial and foreign exchange rate markets.

=== Real federal funds rate ===
In setting monetary policy, the U.S. Federal Reserve (and other central banks) uses open market operations, affecting the amounts of very short-term funds (federal funds) supplied and demanded and thus affecting the federal funds rate. By targeting this at a low rate, they can encourage borrowing and thus economic activity; or the reverse by raising the rate. Like any interest rate, there are a nominal and a real value defined as described above. Further, there is a concept called the "equilibrium real federal funds rate" (r*, or "r-star"), alternatively called the "natural rate of interest" or the "neutral real rate", which is the "level of the real federal funds rate, if allowed to prevail for several years, [that] would place economic activity at its potential and keep inflation low and stable." There are various methods used to estimate this amount, using tools such as the Taylor Rule. It is possible for this rate to be negative.

== Negative real interest rates ==
The real interest rate $r$ can be calculated in terms of the nominal interest rate $i$ and the inflation rate $\pi$ via the Fisher equation:

$$r = \frac{i - \pi}{1 + \pi}$$

If there is a negative real interest rate, it means that the inflation rate is greater than the nominal interest rate. If the Federal funds rate is 2% and the inflation rate is 10%, then the borrower would gain 7.27% of every dollar borrowed per year.

$$\frac{0.02 - 0.1}{1 + 0.1} = -0.0727$$

Negative real interest rates are an important factor in government fiscal policy. Since 2010, the U.S. Treasury has been obtaining negative real interest rates on government debt, meaning the inflation rate is greater than the interest rate paid on the debt. Such low rates, outpaced by the inflation rate, occur when the market believes that there are no alternatives with sufficiently low risk, or when popular institutional investments such as insurance companies, pensions, or bond, money market, and balanced mutual funds are required or choose to invest sufficiently large sums in Treasury securities to hedge against risk. Lawrence Summers stated that at such low rates, government debt borrowing saves taxpayer money, and improves creditworthiness. In the late 1940s through the early 1970s, the US and UK both reduced their debt burden by about 30% to 40% of GDP per decade by taking advantage of negative real interest rates, but there is no guarantee that government debt rates will continue to stay so low. Between 1946 and 1974, the US debt-to-GDP ratio fell from 121% to 32% even though there were surpluses in only eight of those years which were much smaller than the deficits.

== See also ==
- Real versus nominal value
- Shadow rate - a variation on the real interest rate
- Inflation
- Deflation
- IS–LM model
- Macroeconomics
- Financial repression
- Natural rate of interest
