= Real and nominal value =

Value in economics and accounting

In economics, nominal value refers to value measured in terms of absolute money amounts, whereas real value is considered and measured against the actual goods or services for which it can be exchanged at a given time. Real value takes into account inflation and the value of an asset in relation to its purchasing power. In macroeconomics, the real gross domestic product compensates for inflation so economists can exclude inflation from growth figures, and see how much an economy actually grows. Nominal GDP would include inflation, and thus be higher.

== Commodity bundles, price indices and inflation ==
A commodity bundle is a sample of goods, which is used to represent the sum total of goods across the economy to which the goods belong, for the purpose of comparison across different times (or locations). At a single point of time, a commodity bundle consists of a list of goods, and each good in the list has a market price and a quantity. The market value of the good is the market price times the quantity at that point of time. The nominal value of the commodity bundle at a point of time is the total market value of the commodity bundle, depending on the market price, and the quantity, of each good in the commodity bundle which are current at the time.

A price index is the relative price of a commodity bundle. A price index can be measured over time, or at different locations or markets. If it is measured over time, it is a series of values $P_t$ over time $t$. A time series price index is calculated relative to a base or reference date. $P_0$ is the value of the index at the base date. For example, if the base date is (the end of) 1992, $P_0$ is the value of the index at (the end of) 1992. The price index is typically normalized to start at 100 at the base date, so $P_0$ is set to 100.

The length of time between each value of $t$ and the next one, is normally constant regular time interval, such as a calendar year. $P_t$ is the value of the price index at time $t$ after the base date. $P_t$ equals 100 times the value of the commodity bundle at time $t$, divided by the value of the commodity bundle at the base date. If the price of the commodity bundle has increased by one percent over the first period after the base date, then P_{1} = 101.

The inflation rate $i_t$ between time $t-1$ and time $t$ is the change in the price index divided by the price index value at time $t-1$:

$i_t = \frac{P_t-P_{t-1}}{P_{t-1}}$

$$= \frac{P_t}{P_{t-1}} - 1$$

expressed as a percentage.

== Real value ==
The nominal value of a commodity bundle tends to change over time. In contrast, by definition, the real value of the commodity bundle in aggregate remains the same over time. The real values of individual goods or commodities may rise or fall against each other, in relative terms, but a representative commodity bundle as a whole retains its real value as a constant from one period to the next. Real values can for example be expressed in constant 1992 dollars, with the price level fixed 100 at the base date.

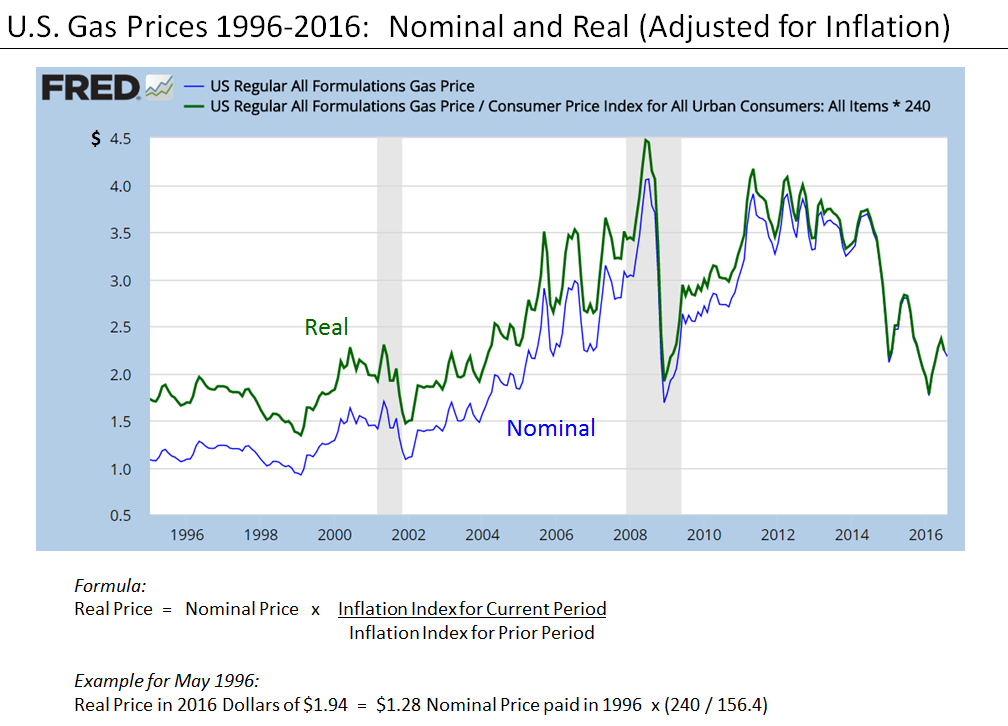
Comparison of real and nominal gas prices 1996 to 2016, illustrating the formula for conversion. Here the base year is 2016.

The price index is applied to adjust the nominal value $Q$ of a quantity, such as wages or total production, to obtain its real value. The real value is the value expressed in terms of purchasing power in the base year. The index price divided by its base-year value $P_t / P_0$ gives the growth factor of the price index. Real values can be found by dividing the nominal value by the growth factor of a price index. Using the price index growth factor as a divisor for converting a nominal value into a real value, the real value at time t relative to the base date is:

$$\frac{P_0 \cdot Q_t}{P_t}$$

== Real growth rate ==
The real growth rate $r_t$ is the change in a nominal quantity $Q_t$ in real terms since the previous date $t-1$. It measures by how much the buying power of the quantity has changed over a single period.

$$r_t = \frac{P_0 \cdot Q_t}{P_t} \Bigg/ \frac{P_0 \cdot Q_{t-1}}{P_{t-1}} - 1$$

$$= \frac{P_{t-1} \cdot Q_t}{P_t \cdot Q_{t-1}} - 1$$

$$= \frac{Q_t}{Q_{t-1}} (\frac{P_t}{P_{t-1}})^{-1} - 1$$

$$= \frac{1 + g_t}{1 + i_t} - 1$$

where $g_t$ is the nominal growth rate of $Q_t$, and $i_t$ is the inflation rate.

$$1 + r_t = \frac{1 + g_t}{1 + i_t}$$

For values of $i_t$ between −1 and 1 (i.e. ±100 percent), we have the Taylor series

$$(1 + i_t)^{-1} = 1 - i_t + i_t^2 - i_t^3 + ...$$

so

$$1 + r_t = (1 + g_t)(1 - i_t + i_t^2 - i_t^3 + ...)$$

$$= 1 + g_t - i_t - g_t i_t + i_t^2 + \text {higher order terms.}$$

Hence as a first-order (i.e. linear) approximation,

$$r_t = g_t - i_t$$

== Real wages and real gross domestic products ==
The bundle of goods used to measure the consumer price index (CPI) is applicable to consumers. So for wage earners as consumers, an appropriate way to measure real wages (the buying power of wages) is to divide the nominal wage (after-tax) by the growth factor in the CPI. Gross domestic product (GDP) is a measure of aggregate output. Nominal GDP in a particular period reflects prices that were current at the time, whereas real GDP compensates for inflation. Price indices and the U.S. National Income and Product Accounts are constructed from bundles of commodities and their respective prices. In the case of GDP, a suitable price index is the GDP price index. In the U.S. National Income and Product Accounts, nominal GDP is called GDP in current dollars (that is, in prices current for each designated year), and real GDP is called GDP in [base-year] dollars (that is, in dollars that can purchase the same quantity of commodities as in the base year).

== Example ==
If for years 1 and 2 (possibly a span of 20 years apart), the nominal wage and price level P of goods are respectively

nominal wage rate: $10 in year 1 and $16 in year 2
price level: 1.00 in year 1 and 1.333 in year 2,

then real wages using year 1 as the base year are respectively:

$10 (= $10/1.00) in year 1 and $12 (= $16/1.333) in year 2.

The real wage each year measures the buying power of the hourly wage in common terms. In this example, the real wage rate increased by 20 percent, meaning that an hour's wage would buy 20% more goods in year 2 compared with year 1.

== Real interest rates ==
As was shown in the section above on the real growth rate,

$$1 + r_t = \frac{1 + g_t}{1 + i_t}$$

where

$r_t$ is the rate of increase of a quantity in real terms,

$g_t$ is the rate of increase of the same quantity in nominal terms, and

$i_t$ is the rate of inflation,

and as a first-order approximation,

$$r_t = g_t - i_t.$$

In the case where the growing quantity is a financial asset, $g_t$ is a nominal interest rate and $r_t$ is the corresponding real interest rate; the first-order approximation $r_t = g_t - i_t$ is known as the Fisher equation. Looking back into the past, the ex post real interest rate is approximately the historical nominal interest rate minus inflation. Looking forward into the future, the expected real interest rate is approximately the nominal interest rate minus the expected inflation rate.

== Cross-sectional comparison ==
Not only time-series data, as above, but also cross-sectional data which depends on prices which may vary geographically for example, can be adjusted in a similar way. For example, the total value of a good produced in a region of a country depends on both the amount and the price. To compare the output of different regions, the nominal output in a region can be adjusted by repricing the goods at common or average prices.

== See also ==
- Aggregation problem
- Classical dichotomy
- Constant Item Purchasing Power Accounting
- Cost-of-living index
- Deflation
- Financial repression
- Fisher equation
- Index (economics)
- Inflation
- Inflation accounting
- Inflation hedge
- Interest
- Money illusion
- National accounts
- Neutrality of money
- Numéraire
- Real interest rate
- Real prices and ideal prices
- Template:Inflation – for price conversions in Wikipedia articles

== Bibliography ==
- Diewert, W. E. (2008) [1987]. "Index Numbers". The New Palgrave Dictionary of Economics (2nd ed.). pp. 1–32. doi:10.1057/978-1-349-95121-5_940-2. ISBN 978-1-349-95121-5.
- O'Donnell, R. (1987). "Real and Nominal Quantities". The New Palgrave: A Dictionary of Economics. Vol. v. 4. pp. 97–98. (Adam Smith's early distinction vindicated)
- Sen, Amartya (1979). "The Welfare Basis of Real Income Comparisons: A Survey". Journal of Economic Literature. 17 (1): 1–45. JSTOR 2723639.
- Usher, D. (1987). "Real Income". The New Palgrave: A Dictionary of Economics. Vol. v. 4. pp. 104–05.
