= Keynes's theory of wages and prices =

Economic theory

Keynes's theory of wages and prices is contained in the three chapters 19-21 comprising Book V of The General Theory of Employment, Interest and Money. Keynes, contrary to the mainstream economists of his time, argued that capitalist economies were not inherently self-correcting. Wages and prices were "sticky", in that they were not flexible enough to respond efficiently to market demand. An economic depression for instance, would not necessarily set off a chain of events leading back to full employment and higher wages. Keynes believed that government action was necessary for the economy to recover.

In Book V of Keynes's theory, Chapter 19 discusses whether wage rates contribute to unemployment and introduces the Keynes effect. Chapter 20 covers mathematical groundwork for Chapter 21, which examines how changes in income from increased money supply affect wages, prices, employment, and profits. Keynes disagrees with the classical view that flexible wages can cure unemployment, arguing that interest rates have a more significant impact on employment. In Chapter 20, Keynes examines the law of supply and its relation to employment. Chapter 21 analyzes the effect of changes in money supply on the economy, rejecting the quantity theory of money and exploring the impact of various assumptions on his theories.

== The role of Book V in Keynes's theory ==
Chapter 19 discusses the question of whether wage rates contribute to unemployment. Keynes's views and intentions on this matter have been vigorously debated, and he does not offer a clear answer in this chapter. The concept of the Keynes effect arises from his attempts to resolve the issue.

Chapter 20 covers some mathematical ground needed for Chapter 21. Chapter 21 considers the question of how a change in income resulting from an increase in money supply will be apportioned between wages, prices, employment and profits. (The results also depend on the exogenous behaviour of the workforce and on the shapes of various functions.)

Similar considerations arise within the body of Keynes's theory since an increase in income due to a change in the schedule of the marginal efficiency of capital will have an equally complicated effect. When the topic arose in Chapter 18 Keynes did not mention that a full analysis needed to be supported by a theory of prices; instead he asserted that "the amount of employment" was "almost the same thing" as the national income. They are different things but under suitable assumptions they move together. Schumpeter and Hicks appear to have taken Keynes's comment at face value, concluding from it that the General Theory analysed a time period too short for prices to adapt, which deprives it of any interest.

Brady and Gorga view Chapters 20 and 21 as providing belated elucidation of the aggregate demand presented earlier in the book, particularly in Chapter 3.

== Chapter 19: Changes in money wages ==
=== Contrast with classical view ===
Keynes summarizes the view of classical economists that the economy should be self-adjusting if wages are fluid, and that they blame rigidity in wages for problems like unemployment. He disagrees with what he says is the orthodox view, based on the quantity theory of money, is that wage reductions have a small effect on aggregate demand, but that this is made up for by demand for other factors of production. Keynes postulates that the classical position has reached a mistaken conclusion by analysing the demand curve for a given industry and transferring this conception "without substantial modification to industry as a whole". Keynes specifically disagrees with the theory of Arthur Cecil Pigou "that in the long run unemployment can be cured by wage adjustments" which Keynes did not see as important compared to other influences on wages.

=== Keynesian analysis ===
Keynes considers seven different effects of lower wages (including the marginal efficiency of capital and interest rates) and whether or not they have an impact on employment. He concludes that the only one that does is interest rates. This indirect effect of wages on employment through the interest rate was termed the "Keynes effect" by Don Patinkin. Modigliani later performed a formal analysis (based on Keynes's theory, but with Hicksian units) and concluded that unemployment was indeed attributable to excessive wages.

Keynes argued that interest rates can also be reduced by increasing the supply of money and that this is more practical and safer than a widespread reduction in wages, which might need to be severe enough to harm consumer confidence which would itself increase unemployment because of reduced demand. He summarises:

There is, therefore, no ground for the belief that a flexible wage policy is capable of maintaining a state of continuous full employment;– any more than for the belief that an open-market monetary policy is capable, unaided, of achieving this result. The economic system cannot be made self-adjusting along these lines.

And having come to the view that "a flexible wage policy and a flexible money policy come, analytically, to the same thing", he presents four considerations suggesting that "it can only be an unjust person who would prefer a flexible wage policy to a flexible money policy".

Axel Leijonhufvud attached particular significance to this chapter, adopting the view in his 1968 book Keynesian economics and the economics of Keynes that its omission from the IS-LM model had pointed Keynesian economics in the wrong direction. He argued that:

His [Keynes's] followers understandably decided to skip the problematical dynamic analysis of Chapter 19 and focus on the relatively tractable static IS-LM model.

== Chapter 20: The employment function ==
Chapter 20 is an examination of the law of supply. Keynes makes use for the first time of the "first postulate of classical economics", and also for the first time assumes the existence of a unit of value allowing outputs to be compared in real terms. He depends heavily on an assumption of perfect competition, which indeed is implicit in the "first postulate". An important difference is that when competition is not perfect, "it is marginal revenue, not price, which determines the output of the individual producer". Keynes interprets the relation between output and employment as a causative relation between effective demand and employment. He discusses what happens at full employment concluding that wages and prices will rise in proportion to any additional expenditure leaving the real economy unchanged. The money supply remains constant in wage units and the rate of interest is unaffected.

== Chapter 21: The theory of prices ==
The purpose of this chapter is to examine the effect of a change in the quantity of money on the rest of the economy. Keynes does not provide a conclusive statement of his views, but rather presents an initial simplification followed by a number of corrections.

=== Keynes's initial simple model ===
Keynes's simplified starting point is this: assuming that an increase in the money supply leads to a proportional increase in income in money terms (which is the quantity theory of money), it follows that for as long as there is unemployment wages will remain constant, the economy will move to the right along the marginal cost curve (which is flat) leaving prices and profits unchanged, and the entire extra income will be absorbed by increased employment; but once full employment has been reached, wages, prices (and also profits) will increase in proportion to the money supply. This is the "modified quantity theory of money".

=== Quantity theory of money ===
Keynes does not accept the quantity theory. He writes effective demand [meaning money income] will not change in exact proportion to the quantity of money.

The correction is based on the mechanism we have already described under Keynesian economic intervention. Money supply influences the economy through liquidity preference, whose dependence on the interest rate leads to direct effects on the level of investment and to indirect effects on the level of income through the multiplier. This account has the fault we have mentioned earlier: it treats the influence of r on liquidity preference as primary and that of Y as secondary and therefore ends up with the wrong formula for the multiplier. However once we correct Keynes's correction we see that he makes a valid point since the effect of money supply on income is no longer one of proportionality, and cannot be one of proportionality so long as part of the demand for money (the speculative part) is independent of the level of income.

=== Movement along the supply curve ===
Keynes writes that the marginal cost curve is not in fact flat, although his reasons are unclear.

=== Premature motion of wages ===
Wages are exogenous in Keynes's system. In order to obtain a determinate result for the response of prices or employment to a change in money supply he needs to make an assumption about how wages will react. His initial assumption was that so long as there is unemployment workers will be content with a constant money wage, and that when there is full employment they will demand a wage which moves in parallel with prices and money supply.

His corrected explanation is that as the economy approaches full employment, wages will begin to respond to increases in the money supply. Wage inflation remains a function of the level of employment, but is now a progressive response rather than a sharp corner.

Keynes's assumptions in this matter had a significant influence on the subsequent fate of his theories.

He also remarks as point (3) that some classes of worker may be fully employed while there is unemployment amongst others.

=== Components of marginal cost ===
Although we have treated an employer's marginal cost as being his or her wage bill, this is not entirely accurate. Keynes isolates user cost as a separate component, identifying it as "the marginal disinvestment in equipment due to the production of marginal output". His point (5), which may be considered a technical detail, is that user cost is unlikely to move in exact parallel with wages.

=== Asymmetry of Keynes's assumptions ===
Keynes mentions in §V that there is an asymmetry in his system deriving from the stickiness he postulates in wages which makes it easier for them to move upwards than downwards. Without resistance to downward motion, he tells us, money wages would fall without limit "whenever there was a tendency for less than full employment" and:

... there would be no resting-place below full employment until either the rate of interest was incapable of falling further or wages were zero. In fact we must have some factor, the value of which in terms of money is, if not fixed, at least sticky, to give us any stability of values in a monetary system.

=== Symbolic statement of Keynes's theory of prices ===
In §VI Keynes draws on the mathematical results of his previous chapter. Money supply is the independent variable, with total real output y as varying in accordance with it, and prices, wages and employment as being related to output in the same way as in Chapter 20.

==== Constant velocity of circulation ====
Keynes begins with the equation MV=D where:

- M is the quantity of money
- V is the velocity of money
- D is the effective demand, the total output/income in money terms.

This equation is useful to Keynes only under the assumption that V is constant, from which it follows that output in money terms D moves in proportion to M and that prices will do the same only if they move in proportion to output in money terms, i.e. only if Keynes's e_{p} is unity. If this condition holds then it follows from the formulae for e_{p} and $\epsilon$ above that $\epsilon_\nu+\epsilon_W$ is infinite and therefore that the price elasticity of supply is zero. Keynes gets an equivalent result by a different path using one of his relations between elasticities.

So his conclusion is that if the velocity of circulation is constant, then prices move in proportion to money supply only in conditions in which real output is also constant.

==== Variable velocity of circulation ====
Keynes begins by defining a new elasticity:

- $e_d = \frac{M}{D} \frac{\textrm d D}{\textrm d M}$.

e_{d} differs from the other elasticities in not being a property of the supply curve. The elasticity of D_{w} – i.e. of Y – with respect to M is determined by the gradients of the preference functions in Keynes's theory of employment, L(), S(), and I_{s}(). e_{d} is determined jointly by these things and by the elasticity of D with respect to D_{w} but is not analysed here.

Keynes proceeds to consider the response of prices to a change in money supply asserting that:

- $\frac{M}{p} \frac{\textrm d p}{\textrm d M} = e_p \cdot e_d\qquad\textrm{where}\qquad e_p = 1 - e_e e_o(1-e_w)$.

e_{p} had been defined earlier and is now incorrectly equated to $1 - e_e e_o(1-e_w)$ when its true value has already been given as $1 - e_o (1-e_w)$. This is presumably the "inadequate derivation of the equations on page 305" mentioned by the editors of the RES edition on page 385. The likeliest explanation is that Keynes wrote this part while working with a definition of e_{o} as the elasticity of output in real terms with respect to employment rather than with respect to output in wage units.

== See also ==
- Keynesian Revolution
- Keynesian economics
