= Cambridge Circus (economics) =

The Cambridge Circus or Keynes's Circus was a group of young Cambridge economists closely associated with John Maynard Keynes. The group consisted of Richard Kahn, James Meade, Joan Robinson, Austin Robinson, and Piero Sraffa. The Circus formed immediately following the 31 October 1930 publication of Keynes's A Treatise on Money. The group met to read and discuss the Treatise and to provide feedback on Keynes's continuing theoretical work that would lead to his General Theory of Employment, Interest, and Money. Sraffa initiated the group, which met in Kahn's rooms of the Gibb's Building at King's College. The Circus met among themselves and in a seminar, which included some undergraduates, during the 1930–1931 academic year. The seminar convened in the Old Combination Room of Trinity College.

Kahn acted as the group's spokesperson and met with Keynes weekly to discuss the Circus's thoughts. Kahn identifies the "widow's cruse" and "Danaid jar" fallacy as the most substantive issue in the group's discussions. The issue referred to Keynes's statement in the Treatise that an entrepreneur who spent his profits on consumption goods would increase profits for another entrepreneur by the same amount and that these profits would percolate through the economy endlessly like the oil from the widow's cruse in I Kings 17:16. (The reverse case, where entrepreneurs save, is analogous to the Danaid's jar that never fills). The Circus challenged Keynes's implicit assumption that there was a fixed supply of consumption goods.

The influence of the group on the General Theory has been debated. Joseph Schumpeter stated that Kahn's contribution was almost that of a co-author, but Kahn himself denied this. On the other hand, Don Patinkin argued that most of Keynes's major breakthroughs came after the group disbanded in Spring 1931.

The group kept no records but several first hand accounts of the group's meetings have been published.
