= We are all Keynesians now =

Phrase coined by Milton Friedman

"We are all Keynesians now" is a famous phrase attributed to Milton Friedman and later rephrased by U.S. president Richard Nixon. It is popularly associated with the reluctant embrace in a time of financial crisis of Keynesian economics, for example, fiscal stimulus, by individuals such as Nixon who had formerly favored less government intervention policies. The phrase "we are all ... now" has become a formula applied to various other concepts since.

== History and variations ==
In his 1969 book, Carl Turner cites a Russian article by I.G. Blyumin from 1947, referring to what was already the 'famous remark'.

The phrase was later attributed to Milton Friedman in the December 31, 1965, edition of Time magazine. Although generally attributed to Friedman, economics columnist Henry Hazlitt had prominently used that expression a decade earlier in a Newsweek column. In the February 4, 1966, edition, Friedman wrote a letter clarifying that his original statement had been "In one sense, we are all Keynesians now; in another, nobody is any longer a Keynesian".

Friedman's expression was purportedly a rejoinder to the 1888 claim of British politician William Vernon Harcourt that "We are all socialists now"; a declaration that was reprinted for a Newsweek magazine cover story in 2009.

In 1971, after taking the United States off the Bretton Woods system, Nixon was quoted as saying he was "now a Keynesian in economics", which became popularly associated with Friedman's phrase.

In 2002, Peter Mandelson wrote an article in The Times declaring "we are all Thatcherites now", referring to the acceptance among the other political parties of Margaret Thatcher's economic policies.

The phrase was used during the 2008 financial crisis, when economists called for massive investment in infrastructure and job creation as a means of economic stimulation.

In 2015, United States Supreme Court Justice Elena Kagan remarked, regarding judicial philosophy, "we're all textualists now".
