= Julius Wulff =

Danish politician and journalist (1852–1924)

Personal details
- Born: 1852
- Died: 1924 (aged 71–72)

Julius Wulff (1852–1924) was a Danish conservative politician and journalist. His formal studies were in Zoology and he worked as a teacher in Hjørring from 1879 to 1887. During this period he developed his interest in politics becoming the editor of a Conservative journal. He served for two periods as a Danish conservative member of parliament (1895–98 and 1909–18) and he was interested in business policy and customs issues. He was a prominent proponent of protection of domestic industry and an opponent of the sale of the Danish West Indies to the United States.

== Selected publications ==
- Wulff, Julius. “Have en Nations Forbrugere og Producenter modsatte Interesser?” (Do a Nation's Consumers and Producers Represent Opposite Interests?). Tidsskrift for Industri og Haandvark, 1896.
- Wulff, Julius. “Have Forbrugere og Producenter modsatte Interesser?” (Do Consumers and Producers Represent Opposite Interests?), Nationalakonomisk Tidsskrift, 1896.
- Wulff, Julius. “Indenlandsk Produktions nationalgkonomiske Betydning” (The Benefit of Domestic Production to a Nation). Tidsskrift for Industri og Haandvark, 191 1.
- Wulff, Julius. Hvorledes Guld kan yngle (How Gold May Multiply). Landsforeningen Dansk Arbejde, 1924.
