= Wage unit =

Unit of measurement for monetary quantities

The wage unit is a unit of measurement for monetary quantities introduced by Keynes in his 1936 book The General Theory of Employment, Interest and Money (General Theory). A value expressed in wage units is equal to its price in money units divided by the wage (in money units) of a man-hour of labour.

== Other units of value ==
=== Labour theory of value ===
The classical economists believed that the value of a product could be identified with the number of man-hours of labour which went into its production. This value was inherently real.

=== Monetary (nominal) values ===
Economic values can always be expressed in monetary terms except in a barter economy. There are two reasons to avoid doing so. The first is in order to make comparisons of wealth between different periods or currencies. The second is that in many simple models all prices will move together – for instance in perfect competition the effect of a change in money supply may be a proportional change in all prices. In the latter case it is easier to work with a single variable denoting price level than with a vector of prices; and real values are then automatically available as money values divided by the common price level.

=== Real values ===
The use of real values beyond the confines of simple models relies on price indexes derived from baskets of goods. A complication arises if values defined this way are used in an economic model, which is that the model may treat wages differently from prices. If services (which may sometimes amount to direct payment for labour) are included in the index, care needs to be taken to avoid confusion.

=== Wheat values ===
Pigou, in his paper on the value of money, used wheat values, which he claimed to have taken from Marshall. The value of money is represented by "the number of bushels of wheat which a unit of it will purchase".

== Properties of wage units ==
If p is the price level and W is the wage rate in money units, and if X is a value in real terms, then Xp/W is the same value in wage units; if Y is a monetary value, then Y/W is the value in wage units.

If prices and wages move together, then values in wage units move in parallel with real values. If prices move while wages are fixed, then values in wage units move in parallel with prices. There is unbounded scope for simultaneous movement of wages and prices, whereas prices have only limited freedom to move relative to wages, so values in wage units resemble real values more than they resemble money values.

== Keynes's reasons for eschewing "real" values ==
Keynes's decision not to work in real terms was in tune with the intellectual fashion in his day. Schumpeter observes that:

most of the leading Austrians took a critical, not to say hostile, attitude toward the idea of 'measuring' variations in the purchasing power of money (reciprocal of price level) by index numbers. They were inclined to refuse citizenship to the concept of price level and, in any case, to deny its measurability on principle [he supplies a reference to von Mises]. In view of the fact that so many economists placed and place an uncritical trust in index figures without troubling themselves about their meaning [he supplies a footnote referring to Keynes], this attitude provided a much needed antidote.

and the footnote reads:

In the last ten years or so a reaction has set in of which the most important symptom is that Lord Keynes, who in the Treatise on Money (1930) evidently attached much importance to price indices as tools of theoretical analysis, entirely avoided their use in his General Theory (1936).

Keynes viewed real values as introducing unnecessary imprecision rather than as being meaningless. He comments that...

...the well-known, but unavoidable, element of vagueness which admittedly attends the concept of the general price-level makes this term very unsatisfactory for the purposes of a causal analysis, which ought to be exact.

Nevertheless these difficulties are rightly regarded as 'conundrums'. They are 'purely theoretical' in the sense that they never perplex, or indeed enter in any way into, business decisions and have no relevance to the causal sequence of economic events, which are clear-cut and determinate in spite of the quantitative indeterminacy of these concepts. It is natural, therefore, to conclude that they not only lack precision but are unnecessary. Obviously our quantitative analysis must be expressed without using any quantitatively vague expressions. And, indeed, as soon as one makes the attempt, it becomes clear, as I hope to show, that one can get on much better without them.

== The units of the General Theory ==
Keynes used a subscript w (not used by this article) to indicate values in wage units, but was imprecise and inconsistent. In the words of Bradford and Harcourt:

On balance, it appears that for all the ingenuity and subtlety of Keynes's reasoning on the question of units, he ultimately failed to apply it consistently in The General Theory. Given the importance attached to these concerns in Chapter 4, this is a serious defect...

Variables in the equations below are defined as follows:

Meaning	in real terms	in wage units	in money terms	pure number
wage rate (per man-hour)			W	
pricel level (per unit of real output)			p	
consumption	c	C		
saving	s	S		
income	y	Y		
investment schedule	i	I		
liquidity preference		L()		
money supply		M̂		
interest rate				r
proportion of income consumed				λ()

The conversion factor between wage units and real terms is p/W, so C=(p/W)⋅c. W is assumed given but p is an unknown which needs to be determined.

=== The propensity to consume/save ===
The propensity to consume is introduced in Chapter 8 as the desired level of expenditure on consumption (for an individual or aggregated over an economy) as a function of income. Let us assume that the proportion λ of income consumed is a function of real income, so

c = y⋅λ(y) C = Y⋅λ(Y/(p/W))

Keynes assumes that λ(y) varies relatively slowly with y, and that p/W moves only within a narrow compass, and thus concludes that changes in p/W have only a weak effect on C, allowing us to adopt the approximation C=C(Y), i.e. to treat the propensity to consume as independent of the price level. Keynes shows that he is conscious that this is an approximation in Point 1 of §II of Chapter 8.

The propensity to save is the complement of the propensity to consume: S(Y) = Y - C(Y). It plays an important role in Keynes's formalism as one of the exogenous quantities determining the state of the economy. The interaction of these quantities is expressed as a pair of simultaneous equations in wage units, in which Y and r (total income in wage units and the interest rate) are considered to be the sole variables. The manoeuvre by which Keynes approximates C as C(Y) rather than as a function of Y and p together is essential to avoiding the occurrence of p in these equations.

=== Liquidity preference ===
Keynes's initial (Chapter 13) model of liquidity preference considers the demand for money to depend solely on the interest rate. This is purely monetary: the liquidity preference can be written L(r). His more elaborate theory (Chapter 15) makes liquidity preference depend on Y as well as on r. He provides no w subscript for income, implying that it is specified in money terms, in which case L should also be in money terms; but this is contradicted later (p246) when Keynes says that L is in wage units.

Liquidity preference and money supply provide the second key equation in Keynes's system. The LM equation states that $M = L(Y,r);$ in words, that the amount of money in circulation is equal in equilibrium to the amount demanded at income Y and interest rate r. Both sides of this equation are regarded as exogenous. For most purposes the equation is equally acceptable in money terms and in wage units, since the conversion factor W is itself exogenous, and if a quantity is exogenous in one set of units, and the conversion factor to another set of units is also exogenous, then the quantity is equally exogenous in the second set of units.

=== The schedule of the marginal efficiency of capital ===
The 'schedule of the marginal efficiency of capital' determines how much investment will be profitable as a function of the interest rate. It is introduced in Chapter 11 of the General Theory with no mention of units. The definition is of a quantity in real terms: it specifies "by how much investment... will have to increase within the period, in order that its marginal efficiency should fall to any given level" (p136): in other words, how much new equipment will give a return above that level. This is viewed as an exogenous quantity.

The role of the schedule of the marginal efficiency of capital in Keynes's system is through the IS equation, which asserts that $I(r) = S(Y)$, i.e. that the amount of investment I(r) which will take place at interest rate r is equal to the amount of saving which will take place at income Y. This equation is stated in wage units and combined with the LM equation (likewise in wage units); and the two equations together are deemed to determine the values of the two variables Y and r. Keynes does not provide an explanation of how the schedule, having been defined in real terms, can be treated as exogenous in wage units.

== Interpretation of income in wage units ==
Although Keynes needs the first equation in order to get a solution, he presents his system as complete except for details as soon as he has the last two equations, which he interprets as being in Y and r alone.

This creates the possibility of falling into a certain misunderstanding. Assuming that income is indeed determined in wage units by these equations, it might be supposed that – income being a quantity in man-hours – the level of employment is likewise determined. But the expression of income in man-hours is purely artificial. In particular, although the level of income has been determined, its division between wages and profits has not, so the level of employment is indeterminate.

== Units for IS-LM curves ==
John Hicks presented Keynesian arguments in money terms in "Mr. Keynes and the "Classics"". He supplies income as an argument to both propensity to save and liquidity preference, implying that the proportion of income saved is a function of income in money rather than real terms. Keynes himself complained that Hicks made 'saving a function of money income'.

He was aware that there were difficulties and at one point had smoothed his path by assuming that wages were constant. The following observation is by Richard Kahn:

I was surprised by Hicks' statement that:

All expositors of Keynes (including myself) have found this procedure [working in terms of wage-units] a difficulty [...] We had to find some way of breaking the circle. The obvious way of doing so was to begin by setting out the rest (multiplier, liquidity preference and so on) on the assumptions of fixed money wages.

The result, as Hicks points out, is the false impression that Keynes assumed wages to be constant at any level of employment short of full employment.

Hicks' procedure is completely unnecessary. Keynes, in many contexts, emphasised the 'stickiness' of wages. But that was not the reason for his use of the money-wage as a unit.
