= Keynesian cross =

Concept in economics

Keynesian cross diagram

The Keynesian cross diagram is a formulation of the central ideas in Keynes' General Theory of Employment, Interest and Money. It first appeared as a central component of macroeconomic theory as it was taught by Paul Samuelson in his textbook, Economics: An Introductory Analysis. The Keynesian cross plots aggregate income (labelled as Y on the horizontal axis) and planned total spending or aggregate expenditure (labelled as AD on the vertical axis).

== Overview ==
In the Keynesian cross diagram, the upward sloping blue line represents the aggregate expenditure for goods and services by all households and firms as a function of their income. The 45-degree line represents an aggregate supply curve which embodies the idea that, as long as the economy is operating at less than full employment, anything demanded will be supplied. Aggregate expenditure and aggregate income are measured by dividing the money value of all goods produced in the economy in a given year by a price index. The resulting construct is referred to as Real Gross Domestic Product.

The sum of all incomes earned in the economy in a given period of time is identically equal to the sum of all expenditures, an identity resulting from the circular flow of income. But not all expenditures are planned. For example, if an automobile plant produces 1,000 cars, but not all of them are sold, the unsold cars are labelled as inventory investment in the GDP accounts. The income earned by the people who produced those cars is part of aggregate income and the value of all of the cars produced is part of total expenditure. But only the value of the cars that are sold is part of planned aggregate expenditure.

In the diagram, the equilibrium level of income and expenditure is determined where the aggregate demand curve intersects the 45-degree line. At this point there is no unintended accumulation of inventories. The equilibrium point is labelled as Y'. Under standard assumptions about the determinants of aggregate expenditure, the AD curve is flatter than the 45-degree line and the equilibrium level of income, Y', is stable. If income is less than Y', aggregate expenditure exceeds aggregate income and firms will find that their inventories are falling. They will hire more workers, and incomes will increase causing a movement back towards Y'. Conversely, if income is greater than Y', aggregate expenditure is less than aggregate income and firms will find that inventories are increasing. They will fire workers, and incomes will fall. Y' is the only level of income at which there is no desire on the part of firms to change the number of people they employ.

Aggregate employment is determined by the demand for labor as firms hire or fire workers to recruit enough labor to produce the goods demanded to meet aggregate expenditure. In Keynesian economic theory, equilibrium is typically assumed to occur at less than full employment, an assumption that is justified by appealing to the empirical connection between employment and output known as Okun's law.

Aggregate expenditure can be broken down into four component parts. These consist of consumption expenditure C, planned investment expenditure, I_{p}, government expenditure on goods and services, G and exports net of imports, NX. In the simplest exposition of Keynesian theory, the economy is assumed to be closed (which implies that NX = 0), and planned investment is exogenous and determined by the animal spirits of investors. Consumption is an affine function of income, C = a + bY where the slope coefficient b is called the marginal propensity to consume. If any of the components of aggregate demand, a, I_{p} or G rises, for a given level of income, Y, the aggregate demand curve shifts up and the intersection of the AD curve with the 45-degree line shifts right. Similarly, if any of these three components falls, the AD curve shifts down and the intersection of the AD curve with the 45-degree line shifts left. In the General Theory, Keynes explained the Great Depression as a downward shift of the AD curve caused by a loss of business confidence and a collapse in planned investment.

== Original formulation ==
The Keynesian cross is a simplification of the ideas contained in the first four chapters of the General Theory. It differs in several significant ways from the original formulation. In its original formulation, Keynes envisaged a pair of functions that he referred to as an aggregate demand and an aggregate supply function. But unlike the formulation in Samuelson's textbook, these were not relationships between real aggregate expenditure and real aggregate income. They were envisaged as relationships connecting GDP and the volume of employment. Keynes devoted an entire chapter of the General Theory, chapter 4, to the choice of units. In the book, he uses only two units: money units and labor hours. GDP can be unambiguously measured in monetary units such as dollars or euro, but we cannot add up tons of steel and kilos of oranges. Keynes acknowledged that labor is not homogenous, but he proposed to solve that problem by arguing that if a brain surgeon is paid ten times more than a garbage collector then the brain surgeon is supplying ten times as many "effective units" of labor. This construction leads to an alternative formulation of the measurement of GDP that can be constructed by dividing the dollar value of all the goods and services produced in a given year by a measure of the money wage.

In the original formulation of Keynesian economics in the General Theory, Keynes abandoned the classical concept that the demand and supply of labor are always equal and instead, he simply dropped the labor supply curve from his analysis. The failure of Keynes to provide an alternative micro-foundation to his theory led to widespread disagreement about the intellectual foundations of Keynesian economics.

== Assumptions ==
The Keynesian cross produces an equilibrium under several assumptions. First, the AD (blue) curve is positive. The AD curve is assumed to be positive because an increase in national output should lead to an increase in disposable income and, thus, an increase in consumption, which makes up a portion of aggregate demand. Second, the AD curve is assumed to have a positive, vertical intercept. The AD curve must have a positive, vertical intercept to cross the AD=Y curve. If the curves do not cross, there is no equilibrium and no equilibrium output can be determined. The AD curve will have a positive, vertical intercept as long as there is some aggregated demand—from consumer spending, investment, net exports, or government spending—even if there is no national output. The slope of the AD curve is steeper given a high multiplier value.

== Mathematical formulation ==
The Keynesian cross can be demonstrated through the following system of equations:

Start with a linear aggregate-expenditure function:

$AE = AE_0 + bY \;,\; 1 > b > 0 \;,$

With the corresponding angle:

$\theta = \tan^{-1}(b) \;.$

Where $AE$ is aggregate expenditures, $AE_0$ is autonomous expenditures (injections), $b$ is the marginal propensity to spend (the fraction of additional income spent), and $Y$ is national income (or economic output). Since $b < 1$ the angle of this line will always be less than 45 degrees.

Next, a 45 degree angle line representing the equality between aggregate expenditures and national income is introduced:

$AE = Y \;,$

The vertical intercept of this line is 0 while the slope is 1. Hence, the angle of this second line is:

$\theta = \tan^{-1}(1) = 45^{\circ} \;.$

In accordance with economic equilibrium, to find the point of intersection (denoted using $Y^*$) between the two lines when both equations are satisfied, we set aggregate expenditures equal to the equilibrium level of income:

$Y^* = AE_0 + bY \;,$

Since $Y = Y^*$ when we isolate $Y^*$ , we get the equilibrium condition:

$Y^* = \frac{1}{1 - b} \cdot AE_0 \;,$

$1 > b > 0 \Rightarrow k > 1 \;.$

Where $k = \frac{1}{1 - b}$ is the Keynesian spending multiplier. For every $AE_0$ dollars injected into the economy, income increases by $k > 1$ times that amount.

If $b = 1$, the spending multiplier, and hence the equilibrium condition becomes undefined via division by zero. Another reason why the equilibrium condition becomes undefined is because both lines would be at 45 degree angles, and therefore never intersect or produce an equilibrium. On the other hand, when $b < 1$, an equilibrium can be found.

== See also ==
- AD–AS model
- IS–LM model
