= A Treatise on Money =

Economic Treatise

- Author: John Maynard Keynes
- Language: English
- Genre: Nonfiction
- Publisher: Macmillan and Co.
- Publication date: 1930
- Publication place: London, United Kingdom
- Pages: 363 (vol. I); 424 (vol. II)
- OCLC: 802540666

A Treatise on Money is a two-volume book by English economist John Maynard Keynes published in 1930.

== Summary of the work ==
In the Treatise Keynes drew a distinction between savings and investment, arguing that where saving exceeded investment, recession would occur. Thus, Keynes reasoned that during a depression the best course of action would be to promote spending and to discourage saving. Keynes most notably clarified his Theory of Money in catty dialogue with other economists of the day, such as Friedrich Hayek and Dennis Robertson. Keynes described his rejoinder as such "in my Rejoinder to Mr. D. H. Robertson, Published in the Economic Journal for September, 1931, I have endeavoured to re-state in a clearer way what my own theory actually is."

In Keynes' Treatise, he does not agree that booms and busts happen solely because of extrinsic random variables such as "sunspots". Instead, he believes that economic events emerge when there are discrepancies between savings and investments. According to Keynes, a true measure of a nation's prosperity is not anything of physical value such as gold or silver, but by national income. To him, the most important characteristic of national income is consumption.

In Keynes's Treatise, he explained how recessions could happen, but not long-term depressions. He was able to address this further in The General Theory of Employment, Interest and Money. In his General Theory, Keynes argued against the seesaw theory and said that the economy was more like an elevator that can stop at any level. This is because once the economy reaches the bottom, individuals would have no excess income to save. No savings results in no investment so the economy cannot save itself. Without the savings, there is no pressure to lower interest rates, so there is no incentive for businesses to invest. In his theory on money he asserts that investment is an "undependable drive wheel for the economy," and when no new investment can be found, the economy will begin to falter.

== Criticism in the economic community ==
Keynes and Hayek debated the former's theory of money. Keynes felt that Hayek was splitting hairs with him terminologically and published a public response to the Austrian's criticisms, writing, "Dr Hayek has seriously misapprehended the character of my conclusions. He thinks that my central contention is something different from what it really is"; "It is essential to that theory to deny these propositions which Dr Hayek puts in my mouth." The meat of their disagreement from Keynes's perspective concerned ancillary points, and semantic differences in definition, leading him to conclude that Hayek was nit-picking: "So long as a problem of this major magnitude is not cleared up between us, what is the use of discussing 'irritating' terminology, which might not bother Dr Hayek at all if he were not, for these excellent other reasons, looking for trouble? Dr Hayek has missed, or at least does not discuss, the critical point at which our arguments part company. Having passed this by, but finding himself being led down strange and distasteful paths, he tries to prevent himself from being dragged along any further by representing the molehills in the pathway as mountains"

== Coinage of the term market liquidity ==
John Hicks stated that the A Treatise on Money was the first economics publication to use the term liquidity, because he had not been able to find the term used in earlier works.
