= Fiscal multiplier =

Ratio of change in national income arising from a change in government spending

In economics, the fiscal multiplier (not to be confused with the money multiplier) is the ratio of change in national income or revenue arising from a change in government spending. More generally, the exogenous spending multiplier is the ratio of change in national income arising from any autonomous change in spending (including private investment spending, consumer spending, government spending, or spending by foreigners on the country's exports). When this multiplier exceeds one, the enhanced effect on national income may be called the multiplier effect. The mechanism that can give rise to a multiplier effect is that an initial incremental amount of spending can lead to increased income and hence increased consumption spending, increasing income further and hence further increasing consumption, etc., resulting in an overall increase in national income greater than the initial incremental amount of spending. In other words, an initial change in aggregate demand may cause a change in aggregate output (and hence the aggregate income that it generates) that is a multiple of the initial change.

The existence of a multiplier effect was initially proposed by Keynes' student Richard Kahn in 1930 and published in 1931. The multiplier theory was developed to provide rigorous justification for public works spending. Lloyd George, the Liberal candidate in his 1929 election pledge had proposed a public works scheme to reduce unemployment. Keynes and Hubert Henderson wrote a pamphlet titled "Can Lloyd George Do It?: An Examination of the Liberal Pledge" backing his proposal. Richard Kahn's calculations were meant to show that much of the Treasury's expenditure would be recouped through higher taxes and less spending on unemployment insurance.

Some other schools of economic thought reject or downplay the importance of multiplier effects, particularly in terms of the long run. The multiplier effect has been used as an argument for the efficacy of government spending or taxation relief to stimulate aggregate demand.

In certain cases multiplier values less than one have been empirically measured (an example is sports stadiums), suggesting that certain types of government spending crowd out private investment or consumer spending that would have otherwise taken place. This crowding out can occur because the initial increase in spending may cause an increase in interest rates or in the price level. In 2009, The Economist magazine noted "economists are in fact deeply divided about how well, or indeed whether, such stimulus works", partly because of a lack of empirical data from non-military based stimulus. New evidence came from the American Recovery and Reinvestment Act of 2009, whose benefits were projected based on fiscal multipliers and which was in fact followed—from 2010 to 2012—by a slowing of job loss and job growth in the private sector.

== Net government spending ==
The other important aspect of the multiplier is that to the extent that government spending generates new consumption, it also generates "new" tax revenues. For example, when money is spent in a shop, purchases taxes such as VAT are paid on the expenditure, and the shopkeeper earns a higher income, and thus pays more income taxes. Therefore, although the government spends $1, it is likely that it receives back some proportion of the $1 in due course, making the net expenditure less than $1.

Where the government spending is in the form of wages and salaries, there will be an almost immediate recouping of an amount of income tax and other forms of income taxation (such as National Insurance in the UK). This is also true to some extent with spending on pensions and benefits.

== Example ==
For example, suppose that a government spends $1 million to have a factory built. The money does not disappear, but rather becomes wages to builders, revenue to suppliers etc. The builders will have higher disposable income, and consumption may rise, so that aggregate demand will also rise. Supposing further that recipients of the new spending by the government in turn spend their new income, this will raise demand and possibly consumption further, and so on.

The increase in the gross domestic product is the sum of the increases in net income of everyone affected. If the builder receives $1 million and pays out $800,000 to sub-contractors, he has a net income of $200,000 and a corresponding increase in disposable income (the amount remaining after taxes).

This process proceeds down the line through sub-contractors and their employees, each experiencing an increase in disposable income to the degree the new work they perform does not displace other work they are already performing. Each participant who experiences an increase in disposable income then spends some portion of it on final (consumer) goods, according to his or her marginal propensity to consume, which causes the cycle to repeat an arbitrary number of times, limited only by the spare capacity available.

== Applications ==
The multiplier effect is exploited by governments attempting to use fiscal stimulus policies to increase the general level of economic activity. This can be done in a period of recession or economic uncertainty, when unemployment of labor is high and other resources are underutilized. Increased spending by government increases the rate of aggregate demand, increasing business activity, which increases income, which further increases spending and aggregate demand, in a virtuous cycle. The idea is that the total increase in production and income by all parties throughout the economy may be greater than the original increment to government spending, as additional resources are drawn into the circular flows of money spending and business activity through the economy. The existence of idle capacity and involuntary unemployment of labor in the economy can be represented as an output gap—a difference between actual GDP and potential GDP—and a policy of fiscal stimulus may aim at introducing sufficient additional spending, amplified by the multiplier, to speed the closing of the output gap.

Any additional spending by government must be financed, by drawing down reserves, by additional taxes or by issuing additional government debt instruments (i.e. borrowing). Increased taxes exactly matched to increased spending might seem designed to draw out of the circulating flow of the economy an amount of income in taxes exactly equal to the amount being injected by additional government purchases. Increased borrowing to finance additional government purchases might also be supposed to be designed to draw out of the circulating flow an amount equal to the additional government purchases, perhaps by crowding out private borrowing for investment spending. In the history of economic thought, the notion that any increase in government spending necessarily crowds out an equal amount of private spending or investment, through taxation or borrowing, and thus has no net impact on economic activity, is known as the Treasury View, and is regarded as generally fallacious. The argument that the choice of taxes or borrowing to finance government spending must be equivalent in that taxpayers observe borrowing and save in anticipation of taxes to repay the borrowing is known as Ricardian Equivalence, and is sometimes cited as a rationale for believing that fiscal stimulus policy will be made futile by the reactions of rational consumers and businesses, reducing their spending or investing in exact proportion to increases in public spending, in a scenario similar to that envisioned in the Treasury View.

Whether an incremental increase to government spending will have a multiplier effect is thought to depend on circumstances in the economy: first, particularly on the extent to which unemployment of resources may be high, so that the additional demand represented by government purchases may be realized by additional production and higher utilization of resources, without bidding up prices; second, by the state of the financial and credit markets, where demand for money and money instruments may welcome additional government debt as low-risk securities, but may regard investment in private production capacity or capital formation as too risky, given a low level of general business activity.

When unemployment of resources in the economy is high, and cash, in effect, is being hoarded in the financial and credit system, the fiscal multiplier may be 1 or greater. Even a balanced budget fiscal stimulus—additional public purchases fully financed by equivalent increases in taxation without any additional public borrowing—may have a multiplier greater than 1, as the increase in output and business activity reduces persistent unemployment and the anxiety driving hoarding, with resulting increases in private consumption and investment reducing the time it takes for the economy to return to full employment.

Government borrowing to finance additional public purchases in circumstances in which cash is being hoarded in the financial and credit system will not displace private investment spending. An additional supply of low-risk government securities may simply provide vehicles for continued hoarding as short-term government securities are regarded as closely equivalent to cash. In such circumstances, policy to increase aggregate demand and total business activity by means of fiscal measures may treat additional purchases and reductions in taxes as interchangeable near equivalents, with the changes in the net difference between spending and taxation identified as the deficit-financed fiscal stimulus. The net fiscal stimulus may be increased by raising spending above the level of tax revenues, reducing taxes below the level of government spending, or any combination of the two that results in the government taxing less than it spends.

The extent of the multiplier effect in increasing domestic business activity is dependent upon the marginal propensity to consume and marginal propensity to import. Some public purchases or tax reductions may be identified as having larger or more immediate effects on business activity in the short-run. For example, it may be argued that tax cuts or spending aimed at the lowest income households, whose spending is most constrained by income, will have a higher multiplier, because such households will spend a larger fraction of any addition to income faster.

How potent a fiscal stimulus is in stimulating expansion of economic activity may depend on how accommodating the monetary authority—the central bank—is. Many economists subscribe to a consensus view in which monetary policy is preferred as a means of regulating the business cycle, and fiscal stimulus is regarded as effective only in circumstances in which monetary policy has become ineffective, because policy interest rates are approaching the zero lower bound or a liquidity trap has developed, in which the financial system is hoarding money and failing to finance risky investment in capital formation and increased output. If monetary policy was effective, monetary policy would dominate fiscal policy, making the latter ineffective. Additional public borrowing and spending would tend to increase interest rates, because the monetary authority would increase interest rates in response to additional public borrowing and spending, in an effort to contain the effects on the level of public activity—to prevent overheating in the demand for resources and inflation, for example.

Whether the long-run benefits of public investments in public goods and infrastructure, should be considered in constructing a quantified estimate of the multiplier—that is, whether the multiplier should, in effect, incorporate or represent a cost-benefit analysis—is an area of conceptual confusion and controversy. In a case in which there appears to be substantial, persistent unemployment, it can be argued that opportunity costs for public spending are reduced, to the extent that the multiplier exceeds 1. Whether that would or should justify otherwise wasteful government spending is controversial, on the one hand, and on the other hand, whether the supposed wastefulness of government spending justifies reducing multiplier estimates that reflect only GDP effects to smaller estimates reflecting welfare effects, remains a matter of political controversy.

It is sometimes argued that if the money is borrowed, it must eventually be paid back with interest, such that the long-term effect on the economy depends on the trade off between the immediate increase to the GDP and the long-term cost of servicing the resulting government debt. This is a fallacy, insofar as marketable government debts are used by central banks as instruments for monetary policy and by the financial system as instruments for hedging risk and portfolio management. The debts may never be "paid back" and even if they are paid back, it will be in purely nominal terms. The central bank is not committed to any future course of policy by the issuing of public debt, and, in any case, there would never be a "tradeoff" in which it would make sense to reduce future resource employment to "pay back" a debt. The capacity to service the debt could only be enhanced by a future policy of full employment of national resources.

The concept of the economic multiplier on a macroeconomic scale can be extended to any economic region. For example, building a new factory may lead to new employment for locals, which may have knock-on economic effects for the city or region.

== Fiscal multipliers in simplified context ==
The following values are theoretical values based on simplified models that assume, for example, no changes in interest rates or the price level resulting from the fiscal action. The empirical values corresponding to the reality have been found to be lower (see below).

In the following examples the multiplier is the right-hand-side of the equation without the first component.

- y is original output (GDP)
- $b_C$ is marginal propensity to consume (MPC)
- $b_T$ is original income tax rate
- $b_M$ is marginal propensity to import (MPI)
- $\Delta y$ is change in income (equivalent to GDP)
- $\Delta G$ is change in government spending
- $\Delta T$ is change in aggregate taxes

=== Income tax multiplier ===
$\Delta y = \Delta T * \frac{-b_C}{1 - b_C(1 - b_T) + b_M}$

Note: only $\Delta b_T$ is here because if this is a change in income tax rate then $\Delta a_T$ is implied to be 0.

=== Government spending multiplier ===
$$\Delta y = \Delta G * \frac{1}{1 - b_C(1 - b_Tt) + b_M}$$

=== Balanced-budget fiscal multiplier ===
$$\Delta y = \Delta G * 1 = \Delta T * 1$$

== Estimated values ==
=== United States ===
In congressional testimony given in July 2008, Mark Zandi, chief economist for Moody's Economy.com, provided estimates of the one-year multiplier effect for several fiscal policy options. The multipliers showed that any form of increased government spending would have more of a multiplier effect than any form of tax cuts. The most effective policy, a temporary increase in food stamps, had an estimated multiplier of 1.73. The lowest multiplier for a spending increase was general aid to state governments, 1.36. Among tax cuts, multipliers ranged from 1.29 for a payroll tax holiday down to 0.27 for accelerated depreciation. Making the Bush tax cuts permanent had the second-lowest multiplier, 0.29. Refundable lump-sum tax rebates, the policy used in the Economic Stimulus Act of 2008, had the second-largest multiplier for a tax cut, 1.26.

According to Otto Eckstein, estimation has found "textbook" values of multipliers are overstated. The following table has assumptions about monetary policy along the left hand side. Along the top is whether the multiplier value is for a change in government spending (ΔG) or a tax cut (−ΔT).

Monetary Policy Assumption	ΔY/ΔG	ΔY/(−ΔT)
Interest Rate Constant	1.93	1.19
Money Supply Constant	0.6	0.26

The above table is for the fourth quarter under which a permanent change in policy is in force.

In 2013 a study has been published examining economic features that impact fiscal multipliers. It found that the output effect of an increase in government consumption is larger in industrial than in developing countries, the fiscal multiplier is relatively large in economies operating under a predetermined exchange rate but zero in economies operating under flexible exchange rates; fiscal multipliers in open economies are lower than in closed economies and fiscal multipliers in high-debt countries are also zero.

=== Europe ===
Italian economists have estimated multiplier values ranging from 1.4 up to 2.0 when dynamic effects are accounted for. The economists used mafia influence as an instrumental variable to help estimate the effect of central funds given to local councils.

=== IMF ===
In October 2012 the International Monetary Fund released their Global Prospects and Policies document in which an admission was made that their assumptions about fiscal multipliers had been inaccurate.

"IMF staff reports, suggest that fiscal multipliers used in the forecasting process are about 0.5. Our results indicate that multipliers have actually been in the 0.9 to 1.7 range since the Great Recession. This finding is consistent with research suggesting that in today's environment of substantial economic slack, monetary policy constrained by the zero lower bound, and synchronized fiscal adjustment across numerous economies, multipliers may be well above 1.

This admission has serious implications for economies such as the UK where the OBR used the IMF's assumptions in their economic forecasts about the consequences of the government's austerity policies. It has been conservatively estimated by the TUC that the OBR's use of the IMF's under-estimated fiscal multiplication values means that they may have under-estimated the economic damage caused by the UK government's austerity policies by £76 billion.

In their 2012 Forecast Evaluation Report the OBR admitted that underestimated fiscal multipliers could be responsible for their over-optimistic economic forecasts.

"In trying to explain the unexpected weakness of GDP growth over this period, it is natural to ask whether it was caused in part by [fiscal] tightening – either because it turned out to be larger than we had originally assumed or because a given tightening did more to depress GDP than we had originally assumed.
In answering the question, we are concerned with the aggregate impact of different types of fiscal tightening on GDP (measured using so-called 'fiscal multipliers') and not simply the direct contribution that government investment and consumption of goods and services makes to the expenditure measure of GDP. This direct government contribution has been more positive for growth than we expected, rather than more negative."

== Criticisms ==
=== Crowding out ===
It has been claimed that increased fiscal activity does not always lead to increased economic activity because deficit spending can crowd out financing for other economic activity by pushing up interest rates. This phenomenon is argued to be less likely to occur in a recession, when the saving rate is traditionally higher and capital is not being fully utilized in the private market.

=== Marginal propensity to consume ===
As has been discussed, the multiplier relies on the MPC (marginal propensity to consume). The use of the term MPC here is a reference to the MPC of a country (or similar economic unit) as a whole, and the theory and the mathematical formulae apply to this use of the term. However, individuals have an MPC, and furthermore MPC is not homogeneous across society. Even if it was, the nature of the consumption is not homogeneous. Some consumption may be seen as more benevolent (to the economy) than others. Therefore, spending could be targeted where it would do most benefit, and thus be magnified by the highest (closest to 1) MPC. This has traditionally been regarded as construction or other major projects (which also bring a direct benefit in the form of the finished product).

Clearly, some sectors of society are likely to have a much higher MPC than others. Someone with above average wealth or income or both may have a very low (short-term, at least) MPC of nearly zero — saving most of any extra income. But a pensioner, for example, may have an MPC of 1.

Indeed, the extent to which a rise in ongoing pension or benefit payments results in the recipient having confidence in their financial future can actually see that individual's MPC exceed 1. This would occur where the individual felt able to spend some previously accumulated savings as well as the extra income; or alternatively felt confident to borrow money to increase their spending.

More importantly, the consumption of a pensioner or benefit recipient is much more likely to occur in local small business — local shops, pubs and other leisure activities for example. These types of businesses are themselves likely to have a high MPC, and again the nature of their consumption is likely to be in the same, or next tier of businesses, and also of a benevolent nature.

Other individuals with a high, and benevolent, MPC would include almost anyone on a low income — students, parents with young children, and the unemployed.

== See also ==
- Complex multiplier
- Fiscal policy
- Input–output model
- Keynesian economics
- Local multiplier effect
- Return on investment
- Transfer payments multiplier
- Multiplier uncertainty
