= Average propensity to consume =

Average propensity to consume (APC) (as well as the marginal propensity to consume) is a concept developed by John Maynard Keynes to analyze the consumption function, which is a formula where total consumption expenditures (C) of a household consist of autonomous consumption (C_{a}) and income (Y) (or disposable income (Y_{d})) multiplied by marginal propensity to consume (c_{1} or MPC). According to Keynes, the individual's real income determines saving and consumption decisions.

Consumption function: $C={C_a}+cY$

The average propensity to consume is referred to as the percentage of income spent on goods and services. It is the proportion of income that is consumed and it is calculated by dividing total consumption expenditure (C) by total income (Y):

$APC=\frac{C}{Y}=\frac{{C_a}}{Y}+c$

It can be also explained as spending on every monetary unit of income.

Moreover, Keynes's theory claims that wealthier people spend less of their income on consumption than less wealthy people. This is caused by autonomous consumption as everyone needs to eat and get dressed, so they buy a certain amount of food and clothes or pay rent, they all spend some amount of money on these necessities. So the ratio is falling with higher income and wealth. This is why it seems like the poor consume more than the rich. But they only need to spend larger amount of their income on consumption because they have less money available.

Average propensity to consume is not as significant as the marginal propensity to consume (MPC) which represents an additional change in consumer spending as a result of an additional change in household income per monetary unit and it is calculated as derivative of consumption function with respect to income (ratio of change in consumption to change in income). It is used for calculating multiplier in aggregate expenditures model.

== Characteristics of APC ==
=== Average propensity to consume is decreasing ===
Since autonomous consumption in positive (C_{a}>0), the ratio of APC falls with increase in disposable income because with increase in income the proportion of consumption expenditures is decreasing as it creates smaller part of income. Income also rises faster than consumption. Since Keynes considered savings a luxury, he expected the rich to save more from their income than the poor.

=== Average propensity to consume can never be zero ===
The only possible way for APC to be zero is when consumption becomes zero. However, this is impossible because the consumption function includes autonomous consumption (C_{a}), which is always positive.

== Graphical representation of average propensity to consume ==
Graphically, APC is represented by the slope of consumption function which starts from the origin (it holds for the long run: C=cY, C_{a}=0).

If the consumption function does not go through the origin, APC for a certain income is given as the slope of the line connecting the origin and a certain point on the consumption curve for a given income.

== Average propensity to consume and average propensity to save (APS) ==
According to Keynes's consumption and saving (S) functions and their relation to disposable income, income consists of consumption expenditure and saved income: Y=C+S=C_{a}+cY-C_{a}+sY, where s represents marginal propensity to save (MPS). By dividing the equation by income we get that 1=APC+APS.

Thus APC=1-APS. APC is a complement to average propensity to save. So a change in average propensity to consume also determines propensity to save.

This means that the entire income of a household must be saved or spent. With increasing income households can save more (APC is decreasing).

== Average propensity to consume and marginal propensity to consume (MPC) ==
APC>MPC holds in the short run for positive income. When income increases, APC and MPC, both fall. However, the decline in APC is smaller than the decline in MPC. And the consumption function behaves accordingly to Keynesian assumptions.

In the long run, because income rises faster than consumption, with increasing income, APC converges to MPC. So MPC=APC in the long run and it is constant for C_{a}=0. (Mathematically from the consumption function: C=cY, after dividing it by income we get APC=(cY)/Y=c=MPC.)

== APC in the short run and long run ==
Keynesian theory of APC, where APC>MPC, empirically works only in the short term, because it would predict “secular stagnation” (infinity long depression) in the long run, which did not occur. This and the Kuznets riddle were the reasons for further development of consumption function. The Kuznets riddle asks why APC in the short run is decreasing while in the long run APC remains constant. One of the first explanations, which was wrongly almost forgotten, was provided by Duesenberry, who built on the findings of social psychology. The two best-known explanations were provided in the 1950s by Modigliani and Friedman, who built on the results of Irving Fisher's theory of intertemporal consumer choice.

=== Life cycle hypothesis ===
According to life cycle hypothesis, presented by Franco Modigliani, the income and consumption are dependent on stage of life. The reason for that idea is that the income fluctuates during lifetime and savings make it possible to maintain consumption at the required level even in years when income has decreased.

The equation for consumption then looks as $C={MPC_W}*W+{MPC_Y}*Y$ where W stands for wealth, MPC_{W} and MPC_{Y} denote marginal propensities to consume of wealth and income, respectively.

Thus average propensity to consume is equal to $APC=\frac{C}{Y}={MPC_W}*\frac{W}{Y}+{MPC_Y}$

APC may fluctuate for the short term but for the long term it is constant as the structure of society is stable in the long term.

=== Permanent income hypothesis ===
Permanent income hypothesis is Milton Friedman´s theory. Friedman's consumption function is given as $C=MPC*{Y_p}$ where Y_{p} denotes permanent income.

Average propensity to consume is then: $APC=\frac{C}{Y}=c*\frac{Y_p}{Y}$

According to this hypothesis, there are only changes within transitory income (Y=Y_{p}+Y_{t}) in the short run, the consumption does not react to those changes and people with lower income have higher APC as they spent higher proportion of their income on consumption. In the long run on the other hand, changes in income are reflected in permanent income and APC becomes constant.

== See also ==
- Marginal propensity to save
- Marginal propensity to consume
- Average propensity to save
