= Complex multiplier =

This article deals with the concept in economics. For the multiplication of complex numbers, see Complex number#Multiplication.

The complex multiplier is the multiplier principle in Keynesian economics (formulated by John Maynard Keynes). The simplistic multiplier that is the reciprocal of the marginal propensity to save is a special case used for illustrative purposes only. The multiplier applies to any change in autonomous expenditure, in other words, an externally induced change in consumption, investment, government expenditure or net exports. Each of these operates to increase or reduce the equilibrium level of income in the economy.

- any increase to an injection will be multiplied to result in a higher level of aggregate expenditure.
- Any decrease in an injection will be multiplied to result in a lower level of aggregate expenditure.
- Any increase in a withdrawal will be multiplied to result in a lower level of aggregate expenditure.

and...

- Any decrease in a withdrawal will be multiplied to result in a higher level of aggregate expenditure.

The size of the multiplier should take account of all leakages from the circular flow of income and expenditure occurring in all sectors. The complex multiplier can be measured by the following formula:

$$k = 1 / [MPS+MRT+MPM] = 1 / MPW\,\!$$

where MPS= Marginal propensity to save, MRT= Marginal rate of taxation, MPM= marginal propensity to import. MPW = Marginal propensity to withdraw

== See also ==
- Fiscal multiplier
- Transfer payments multiplier
