= Fundamental psychological law =

Concept in Keynesian economics

In Keynesian macroeconomics, the Fundamental Psychological Law underlying the consumption function states that marginal propensity to consume (MPC) and marginal propensity to save (MPS) are greater than zero(0) but less than one(1) MPC+MPS = 1

e.g. Whenever national income rises by $1 part of this will be consumed and part of this will be saved
