= AD–IA model =

The aggregate demand–inflation adjustment model builds on the concepts of the IS–LM model and the AD–AS models, essentially in terms of changing interest rates in response to fluctuations in inflation rather than as changes in the money supply in response to changes in the price level.

== The model ==
The AD–IA model is a Keynesian method used to explain economic fluctuations. This model is used to show undergraduate students how shifts in demand or shocks to prices can affect real GDP around potential. The model assumes that when inflation rises the interest rate rises (monetary policy rule). It also assumes that when real GDP exceeds potential, there is upward pressure on the inflation rate and vice versa.

The model features a downward-sloping demand curve (AD) and a horizontal inflation adjustment line (IA). The point where the two lines cross is equal to potential GDP. A shift in either curve will explain the impact on real GDP and inflation in the short run.

=== Assumptions ===
The AD–IA model depends on the assumption of the monetary policy rule (MPR). The monetary policy rule is that the federal reserve increases interest rates in response to increase in inflation and vice versa.

=== Shifts in demand ===
A shift in demand can occur for the following reasons:

- A change in government spending
- A change in consumption
- A change in taxes
- A change in the monetary rule

Example: Suppose the government were to cut taxes. This would lead to an increase in expenditures and thus an increase in demand. The demand curve would therefore shift to the right and real GDP would be growing above potential. The inflation adjustment line would then shift upward (reflecting an increase in the inflation rate) causing a movement along the new demand curve until real GDP was equal to potential.

== More advanced ==
This model is further advanced in higher levels of undergraduate studies.

David Romer proposed in 2000 that the LM curve be replaced in the IS–LM model. Instead, Romer suggested that although the Federal Reserve uses open market operations to impact the federal funds rate, they are not targeting money supply, but rather the interest rate. Therefore, he suggested removing the LM curve and replacing it with the MP curve of the IS–MP model.

== See also ==
- Federal Reserve
- Real business-cycle theory
