= MyDrink Beverages =

Lithuanian beverage development company

- Type: Private company
- Industry: Beverage industry
- Founded: 2008
- Founder: Adomas Pranevicius; Kastytis Kemezys
- Area served: Global
- Services: Beverage research, formulation and development; Beverage contract manufacturing; Bottling management; Beverage market reports; Beverage marketing
- Parent: BevSource, Inc
- Website: mydrinkbeverages.com

MyDrink Beverages is a Lithuanian beverage development company with a sales office in the United Kingdom and representatives in Denmark and India. It provides beverage development, research, formulation, flavor house selection, contract manufacturing, bottling management, market research, packaging design, and marketing services.

== History ==
MyDrink Beverages was founded in 2008 in Lithuania by Adomas Pranevicius and Kastytis Kemezys. It initially operated as a drinks distributor in the Baltic region. Later, it started selling private label beverages for European clients.

In 2009, the MyDrink Beverages brand was registered in European Union, launched a website and became leaders of Horeca sector in Baltic region for private label beverages.

In 2010, MyDrink Beverages started new projects in France, Germany and Norway. Then it began to offer production management services. In 2011, this company opened the sales office in Denmark and started to offer beverage development services and trade of raw materials of beverage industry.

In 2012, MyDrink Beverages established its own beverage testing and development laboratory and in 2013 opened the sales office in the United Kingdom. It also introduced ready-to-market beverages concepts and beverage lean start-up methodology.

In 2014, MyDrink Beverages became a member of the London Chamber of Commerce and Industry organizing first beverage accelerator in Europe DrinkPreneur Live 2014. It also began to offer construction management services.

In 2018, MyDrink Beverages was acquired by the US-based company BevSource.

== Products ==
MyDrink Beverages manages development of numerous beverage brands such as NapNock energy shot, HighVit Vitamin Drink, Hello Hungry liquid meal, BrumBrum Vitamin Drink, BCAA 5000 Pre-Workout Drink, Super!Natural energy drink, Newcastle United football club energy drink and Cinnamora soft drink.

== Beverages business community ==
In 2014 MyDrink Beverages created a community of beverage entrepreneurs named DrinkPreneur. Main purpose of this community is to inspire and help current and new entrepreneurs of beverage industry by providing necessary information and making communication easier between beverage industry members in all the World.

In 2014 MyDrink Beverages entered a partnership with Zenith International and organized an event dedicated to beverage entrepreneurs called DrinkPreneur Live. It is a European only business accelerator forum with startup awards for new beverage brands. Attendees included more than 100 startup and early stage brand developers.

== See also ==
- Beverage industry
- Food marketing
