= Multiplier-accelerator model =

Economic model

The multiplier–accelerator model (also known as Hansen–Samuelson model) is a macroeconomic model which analyzes the business cycle. This model was developed by Paul Samuelson, who credited Alvin Hansen for the inspiration. This model is based on the Keynesian multiplier, which is a consequence of assuming that consumption intentions depend on the level of economic activity, and the accelerator theory of investment, which assumes that investment intentions depend on the pace of growth in economic activity.

== Model ==
The multiplier–accelerator model can be stated for a closed economy as follows: First, the market-clearing level of economic activity is defined as that at which production exactly matches the total of government spending intentions, households' consumption intentions and firms' investing intentions.

$$Y_{t} = g_{t} + C_{t} + I_{t}$$;

then an equation to express the idea that households' consumption intentions depend upon some measure of economic activity, possibly with a lag:

$$C_{t} = \alpha Y_{t-1}$$;

then an equation that makes firms' investment intentions react to the pace of change of economic activity:

$$I_{t} = \beta [ C_{t} - C_{t-1} ]$$;

and finally a statement that government spending intentions are not influenced by any of the other variables in the model. For example, the level of government spending could be used as the unit of account:

$$g_{t} = 1$$

where $Y_{t}$ is national income, $g_{t}$ is government expenditure, $C_{t}$ is consumption expenditure, $I_{t}$ is induced private investment, and the subscript $t$ is time. Here we can rearrange these equations and rewrite them as a second-order linear difference equation:

$$Y_{t} = 1 + \alpha (1+ \beta)Y_{t-1} - \alpha \beta Y_{t-2}$$

Samuelson demonstrated that there are several kinds of solution path for national income to be derived from this second order linear difference equation. This solution path changes its form, depending on the values of the roots of the equation or the relationships between the parameter $\alpha$ and $\beta$.

== Criticism ==
Jay Wright Forrester argues that the Accelerator-Multiplier Theory cannot create the assumed business cycle but instead is a major contributor to the economic long wave.
