= William Baumol =

American economist (1922–2017)

- Born: William Jack Baumol; February 26, 1922; New York City, U.S.
- Died: May 4, 2017 (aged 95); New York City, U.S.

Academic background
- Education: College of the City of New York (B.Sc. 1942); London School of Economics (Ph.D. 1949)
- Doctoral advisor: Lionel Robbins
- Influences: Joseph Schumpeter; Arthur Pigou; John Maynard Keynes

Academic work
- Discipline: Microeconomics, industrial organization, entrepreneurship
- School or tradition: Neo-Keynesian economics
- Institutions: New York University; Princeton University
- Doctoral students: Lionel W. McKenzie; William G. Bowen; Burton Malkiel; Harold Tafler Shapiro
- Notable ideas: Baumol–Tobin model Baumol's cost disease Contestable market theory Sales revenue maximization model
- Website: Information at IDEAS / RePEc

William Jack Baumol (February 26, 1922 – May 4, 2017) was an American economist. He was a professor of economics at New York University, Academic Director of the Berkley Center for Entrepreneurship and Innovation, and professor emeritus at Princeton University. He was a prolific author of more than eighty books and several hundred journal articles. He is the namesake of the Baumol effect.

Baumol wrote extensively about labor market and other economic factors that affect the economy. He also made significant contributions to the theory of entrepreneurship and the history of economic thought. He is among the most influential economists in the world according to IDEAS/RePEc. He was elected a Fellow of the American Academy of Arts and Sciences in 1971, the American Philosophical Society in 1977, and the United States National Academy of Sciences in 1987.

Baumol was considered a candidate for the Nobel Prize in Economics for 2003, and Thomson Reuters cited him as a potential recipient in 2014, but he died without receiving the prize.

== Early life ==
Baumol was born in the South Bronx. His parents, Solomon and Lillian, were both immigrants from Eastern Europe.

Baumol studied at the City College of New York and was awarded his bachelor's degree in 1942. After college, he served in the U.S. Army in World War II and later worked for the Department of Agriculture as an economist.

== Education ==
He was initially denied entry to the doctoral studies at the London School of Economics and was instead admitted to the Master's program. After impressing onlookers with his debating skills at Lionel Robbins' seminars, he was within weeks switched to the doctoral program and also admitted to the faculty as an Assistant Lecturer.

== Teaching ==
While a professor at Princeton University he supervised some graduate students who would eventually become very well-known economists, including Burton Malkiel, William G. Bowen, and Harold Tafler Shapiro.

== Research ==
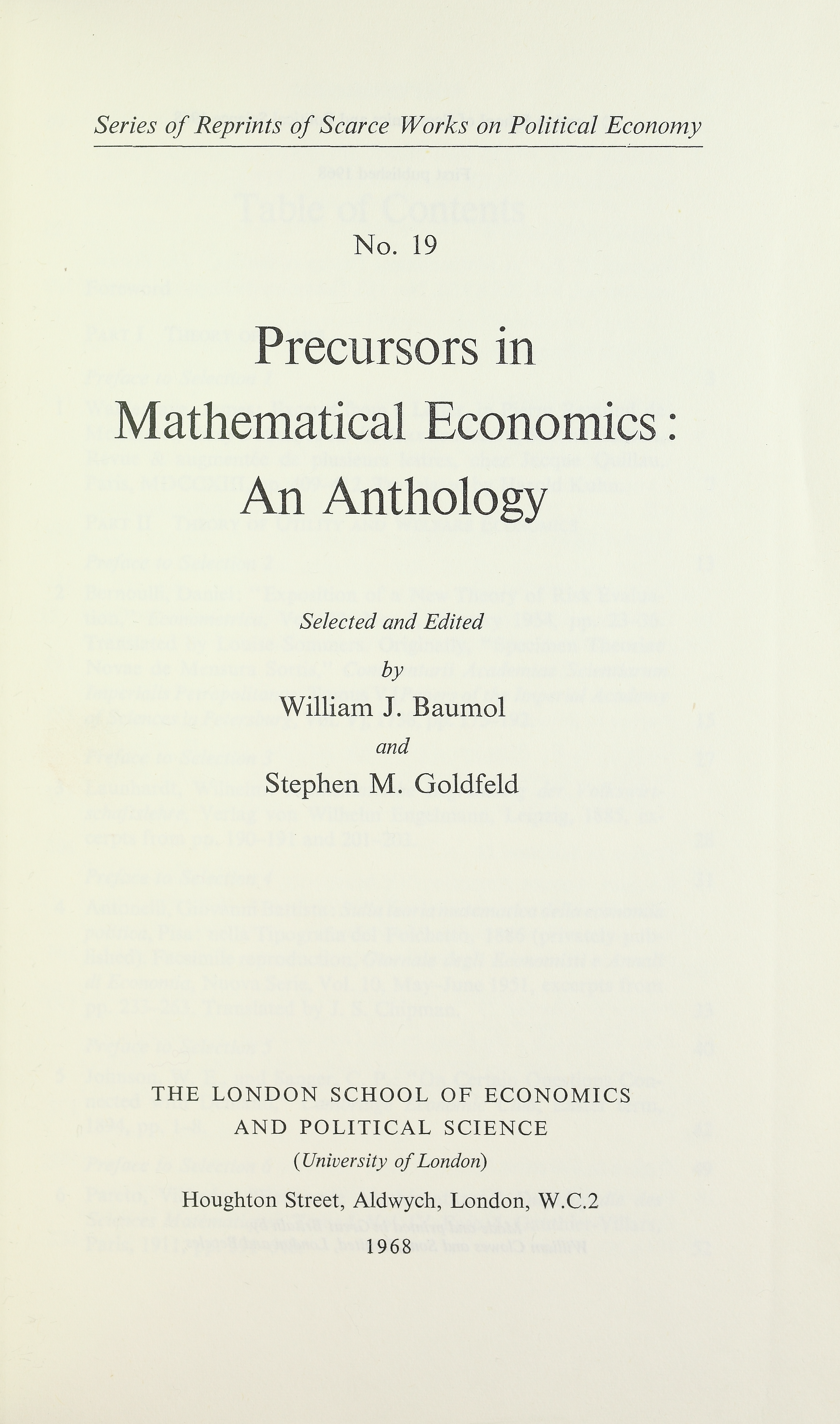
Precursors in mathematical economics, 1968

Among his better-known contributions are the theory of contestable markets, the Baumol-Tobin model of transactions demand for money, Baumol's cost disease, which discusses the rising costs associated with service industries, Baumol's sales revenue maximization model and Pigou taxes. His research on environmental economics recognized the fundamental role of non-convexities in causing market failures.

William Baumol also contributed to the transformation of the field of finance, and published contributions to the areas of efficiency of capital markets, portfolio theory, and capital budgeting.

=== Entrepreneurship ===
The place of the disruptive innovations and innovative entrepreneurs in traditional economic theory (which describes many efficiency-based ratios assuming uniform outputs) presents theoretic quandaries. Baumol contributed greatly to this area of economic theory. The 2006 Annual Meetings of the American Economic Association held a special session in his name, and honoring his many years of work in the field of entrepreneurship and innovation, where 12 papers on entrepreneurship were presented.

The Baumol Research Centre for Entrepreneurship Studies at Zhejiang Gongshang University is named after William Baumol.

In 2003, Baumol received the Global Award for Entrepreneurship Research "[f]or his persistent effort to give the entrepreneur a key role in mainstream economic theory, for his theoretical and empirical studies of the nature of entrepreneurship, and for his analysis of the importance of institutions and incentives for the allocation of entrepreneurship."

The British news magazine, The Economist published an article about William Baumol and his lifelong work to develop a place in economic theory for the entrepreneur (March 11, 2006, pp 68), much of which owes its genesis to Joseph Schumpeter. They note that traditional microeconomic theory normally holds a place for 'prices' and 'firms' but not for that (seemingly) important engine of innovation, the entrepreneur. Baumol is given credit for helping to remedy this shortcoming: "Thanks to Mr. Baumol's own painstaking efforts, economists now have a bit more room for entrepreneurs in their theories."

William Baumol's book, The Microtheory of Innovative Entrepreneurship is the first formal theoretical analysis of the role of innovative entrepreneurs.

== Textbooks ==
Baumol wrote several textbooks in economics, including an introductory textbook with Alan Blinder titled Macroeconomics: Principles and Policy. His economics textbook on operations research was internationally well-received:

In the 1960s and 1970s, nearly every economics department offered a course in operations research methods in economics, and the usual textbook used was Economic Theory and Operations Analysis by W. J. Baumol. An entire generation of economics students was familiar with this book ....

== Professional and philanthropic interests ==
Baumol was a trustee of Economists for Peace and Security. Baumol was known for his interests in the economics of art, including the economics of the performing arts.

== Death ==
Baumol died on May 4, 2017, at the age of 95.

== Major publications ==
- "Community Indifference", 1946, RES
- "A Community Indifference Map: A construction", 1949, RES.
- "A Formalization of Mr. Harrod's Model", 1949, EJ.
- "The Analogy between Producer and Consumer Equilibrium Analysis", with Helen Makower, 1950, Economica.
- Economic Dynamics, with R. Turvey, 1951.
- "The Transaction Demand for Cash: An inventory-theoretic approach", 1952, QJE.
- "The Classical Monetary Theory: The outcome of the discussion", with G.S. Becker, 1952, Economica.
- Welfare Economics and the Theory of the State, 1952.
- "Firms with Limited Money Capital", 1953, Kyklos.
- Economic Processes and Policies, with L.V. Chandler, 1954.
- "More on the Multiplier Effect of a Balanced Budget", with M.H. Peston, 1955, AER.
- "Acceleration without Magnification", 1956, AER.
- "Variety in Retailing", with E.A. Ide, 1956 Management Science.
- "Speculation, Profitability and Stability", 1957, REStat.
- "Activity Analysis in One Lesson", 1958, AER.
- "On the Theory of Oligopoly", 1958, Economica.
- "Topology of Second Order Linear Difference Equations with Constant Coefficients", 1958, Econometrica.
- "The Cardinal Utility which is Ordinal", 1958, EJ.
- Business Behavior, Value and Growth, 1959.
- "Integer Programming and Pricing", with R.E. Gomory, 1960, Econometrica.
- Economic Theory and Operations Analysis, 1961.
- "What Can Economic Theory Contribute to Managerial Economics?", 1961, AER.
- "Pitfalls in Contracyclical Policies: Some tools and results", 1961, REStat.
- "The Theory of Expansion of the Firm", 1962, AER.
- "Stocks, Flows and Monetary Theory", 1962, QJE.
- "An Expected Gain-Confidence Limit Criterion for Portfolio Selection", 1963, Management Science.
- "Rules of Thumb and Optimally Imperfect Decisions", with R. E. Quandt, 1964, American Economic Review, 54, p. 23–46
- "Decomposition, Pricing for Decentralization and External Economics", with T.Fabian, 1964, Management Science.
- "On the Performing Arts: the anatomy of their economic problems", with W.G. Bowen, 1965, AER.
- "Investment and Discount Rates Under Capital Rationing", with R.E.Quandt, 1965, EJ.
- "Informed Judgement, Rigorous Theory and Public Policy", 1965, Southern EJ.
- The Stock Market and Economic Efficiency, 1965.
- Performing Arts: the economic dilemma, 1966.
- "The Ricardo Effect in Point-Input, Point-Output Case", 1966, Essays in Mathematical Economics in Honor of Oskar Morgenstern.
- "Macroeconomics of Unbalanced Growth: The anatomy of urban crisis", 1967, AER.
- "Calculation of Optimal Product and Retailer Characteristics", 1967, JPE.
- "The Firm's Optimal Debt-Equity Combination and the Cost of Capital", with B.G. Malkiel, 1967, QJE.
- "Error Produced by Linearization in Mathematical Programming", with R. Bushnell, 1967, Econometrica.
- "The Dual of Nonlinear Programming and its Economic Interpretation", with M.L.Balinski, 1968, RES.
- "Entrepreneurship in Economic Theory", 1968, May, American Economic Review
- "On the Social Rate of Discount", 1968, AER.
- "On the Discount Rate for Public Projects", 1969, Analysis and Evaluation of Public Expenditures.
- "Input Choices and Rate-of-Return Regulation: An overview of the discussion", with A.K. Klevorick, 1970, Bell JE.
- "Optimal Departures from Marginal Cost Pricing", with D.F. Bradford, 1970, AER.
- "The Economics of Athenian Drama", 1971, QJE.
- Environmental protection, International Spillovers and Trade, 1971.
- "On the Economics of the Theatre in Renaissance London" with Mary Oates, 1972, Swedish JE.
- "The Dynamics of Urban Problems and its Policy Implications", 1972, in Preston and Corry, editors, Essays in Honor of Lord Robbins.
- "Taxation and the Control of Externalities", 1972, AER.
- "Detrimental Externalities and Non-Convexity of the Production Set", with D.F. Bradford, 1972, Economica.
- "The Transformation of Values: What Marx 'Really' Meant", 1974, JEL.
- The Theory of Environmental Policy, with W.E.Oates, 1975.
- Economics, Environmental Policy and Quality of Life, with W.E. Oates and S.A. Batey Blackman 1979.
- Contestable Markets and the Theory of Industry Structure, with J.C. Panzar and R.D. Wilig, 1982
- "Contestable Markets: An Uprising in the Theory of Industry Structure", 1982, "AER".
- Microtheory: Applications and origins, 1986
- Superfairness: Application and theory, with D. Fischer, 1986
- "The Optimal Cash Balance Proposition: Maurice Allais' Priority", with J. Tobin, 1989, JEL
- Productivity and American Leadership: The long view, with S.A. Batey Blackman and E.N. Wolff, 1989.
- Entrepreneurship: Productive, Unproductive and Destructive, Journal of Political Economy, Vol. 98(3), pp. 893–921, 1990
- Perfect Markets and Easy Virtue: Business ethics and the invisible hand, with S.A. Batey Blackman, 1992
- Entrepreneurship, Management and the Structure of Profit, 1993.
- The Free Market Innovation Machine: Analyzing the Growth Miracle of Capitalism, 2002.
- Good Capitalism, Bad Capitalism, and the Economics of Growth and Prosperity, co-authored with Robert Litan and Carl J. Schramm, 2007
- The Cost Disease: Why Computers get Cheaper and Health Care Doesn't, 2012 https://yalebooks.yale.edu/book/9780300198157/cost-disease

== Positions and awards ==
- William Baumol was President of the American Economic Association for 1981.
- 1953 Fellow, Econometric Society
- 1957–58 Guggenheim Fellow
- 1960–70 Trustee, Rider College
- 1965 Honorary LL.D, Rider College (Trustee Emeritus)
- 1965–66 Ford Faculty Fellowship
- 1970 Honorary Fellow, London School of Economics
- 1971 Honorary Doctorate, Stockholm School of Economics
- 1973 Honorary Doctor of Humane Letters, Knox College
- 1973 Honorary Doctorate, University of Basel
- 1975 John R. Commons Award, Omicron Delta Epsilon
- 1975 Townsend Harris Medal, Alumni Association of the City College of New York
- 1982 Distinguished Fellow, American Economic Association
- 1984 Distinguished Member, Economic Association of Puerto Rico
- 1986 Winner, Assoc. of American Publishers Award for Best Book in Business, Management and Economics, Superfairness: Applications and Theory
- 1987 Recipient, Frank E. Seidman Distinguished Award in Political Economy
- 1988 Joseph Douglas Green 1895 Professor of Economics, Princeton University
- 1989 Winner, Assoc. of Am. Publishers Annual Awards for Excellence in Publishing, Honorable Mention in Social Sciences, Productivity and American Leadership: The Long View
- 1992 Recipient, First Senior Scholar in the Arts and Sciences Award, New York University
- 1996 Honorary Degree, University of Limburg, Maastricht, Netherlands
- 1996 Honorary Professorship, University of Belgrano, Buenos Aires, Argentina
- 1999, Honorary Doctor of Humane Letters, Princeton University
- 2003 Winner of the Global Award for Entrepreneurship Research, the Swedish Entrepreneurship Forum (Entreprenörskapsforum), the Research Institute of Industrial Economics (IFN) and the Swedish Agency for Economic and Regional Growth (Tillväxtverket), Stockholm, Sweden

== See also ==
- Baumol–Tobin model
- Baumol's cost disease
