= Transfer payments multiplier =

In Keynesian economics, the transfer payments multiplier (or transfer payment multiplier) is the multiplier by which aggregate demand will increase when there is an increase in transfer payments (e.g., welfare spending, unemployment payments). Transfer payments are not in the same theoretical category as government spending on goods and services because such payments are not directly injected into a goods market. Instead, the spendable funds are transferred to a member of the public, who then may spend some or all of them. For this reason, transfer payments are analyzed as negative taxes, and their multiplier is usually considered to be equal in magnitude but opposite in sign (specifically positive rather than negative) from that of taxes.

One dollar of transfer payments results in up to one dollar of spending by the recipient. In turn, the recipient of that spending has experienced an increase in income and spends a portion of it on more goods, giving the next person income some of which is spent, etc. The result of this chain reaction may be that aggregate spending, and hence equilibrium GDP, has gone up by more than the original dollar. However, the size of this multiplier effect is likely to be diminished by two considerations: first, an upward push that the new spending gives to interest rates, which diminishes spending on goods such as physical capital and consumer durables; and second, an upward push that the spending gives to the general price level, which diminishes the quantity of aggregate demand for several reasons.

Because not all the original dollar is necessarily spent by the recipient of the transfer payment, the resulting multiplier is likely to be somewhat less than the multiplier of government spending on goods and services.

== See also ==
- Complex multiplier
