= A Guide To Keynes =

A Guide to Keynes
- Author: Alvin Hansen
- Language: English
- Subject: Economics
- Publisher: McGraw-Hill
- Publication date: 1953
- Publication place: United States
- Media type: Print
- Pages: 237
- ISBN: 978-0-07-026046-7

A Guide to Keynes is a non-fiction work by Alvin Hansen, about John Maynard Keynes' work The General Theory. It was first published in 1953. Hansen's guide, 237 pages long. It explains Keynes's General Theory in a chapter-by-chapter fashion more accessible to a beginner. Alvin Hansen, once referred to as "the American Keynes", had brought the 1930s Keynesian economics revolution, along with other economists, to the United States.
