= Demand for money =

Concept in economics

In monetary economics, the demand for money is the desired holding of financial assets in the form of money: that is, cash or bank deposits rather than investments. It can refer to the demand for money narrowly defined as M1 (directly spendable holdings), or for money in the broader sense of M2 or M3.

Money in the sense of M1 is dominated as a store of value (even a temporary one) by interest-bearing assets. However, M1 is necessary to carry out transactions; in other words, it provides liquidity. This creates a trade-off between the liquidity advantage of holding money for near-future expenditure and the interest advantage of temporarily holding other assets. The demand for M1 is a result of this trade-off regarding the form in which a person's funds to be spent should be held. In macroeconomics motivations for holding one's wealth in the form of M1 can roughly be divided into the transaction motive and the precautionary motive. The demand for those parts of the broader money concept M2 that bear a non-trivial interest rate is based on the asset demand. These can be further subdivided into more microeconomically founded motivations for holding money.

Generally, the nominal demand for money increases with the level of nominal output (price level times real output) and decreases with the nominal interest rate. The real demand for money is defined as the nominal amount of money demanded divided by the price level. For a given money supply the locus of income-interest rate pairs at which money demand equals money supply is known as the LM curve.

The magnitude of the volatility of money demand has crucial implications for the optimal way in which a central bank should carry out monetary policy and its choice of a nominal anchor.

Conditions under which the LM curve is flat, so that increases in the money supply have no stimulatory effect (a liquidity trap), play an important role in Keynesian theory. This situation occurs when the demand for money is infinitely elastic with respect to the interest rate.

A typical money-demand function may be written as

$$M^d=P\times L(R,Y) \,$$

where $M^d$ is the nominal amount of money demanded, P is the price level, R is the nominal interest rate, Y is real income, and L(.) is real money demand. An alternate name for $L(R,Y)$ is the liquidity preference function.

== Motives for holding money ==
=== Transaction motive ===
The transactions motive for the demand for M1 (directly spendable money balances) results from the need for liquidity for day-to-day transactions in the near future. This need arises when income is received only occasionally (say once per month) in discrete amounts but expenditures occur continuously.

==== Quantity theory ====
The most basic "classical" transaction motive can be illustrated with reference to the Quantity Theory of Money. According to the equation of exchange MV = PY, where M is the stock of money, V is its velocity (how many times a unit of money turns over during a period of time), P is the price level and Y is real income. Consequently, PY is nominal income or in other words the number of transactions carried out in an economy during a period of time. Rearranging the above identity and giving it a behavioral interpretation as a demand for money we have

$$M^d=P \frac {Y} {V} \,$$

or in terms of demand for real balances

$$\frac {M^d} {P}=\frac {Y} {V} \,$$

Hence in this simple formulation demand for money is a function of prices and income, as long as its velocity is constant.

==== Inventory models ====
The amount of money demanded for transactions however is also likely to depend on the nominal interest rate. This arises due to the lack of synchronization in time between when purchases are desired and when factor payments (such as wages) are made. In other words, while workers may get paid only once a month they generally will wish to make purchases, and hence need money, over the course of the entire month.

The most well-known example of an economic model that is based on such considerations is the Baumol-Tobin model. In this model an individual receives her income periodically, for example, only once per month, but wishes to make purchases continuously. The person could carry her entire income with her at all times and use it to make purchases. However, in this case she would be giving up the (nominal) interest rate that she can get by holding her income in the bank. The optimal strategy involves holding a portion of one's income in the bank and portion as liquid money. The money portion is continuously run down as the individual makes purchases and then she makes periodic (costly) trips to the bank to replenish the holdings of money. Under some simplifying assumptions the demand for money resulting from the Baumol-Tobin model is given by

$$\frac {M^d} {P}=\sqrt {\frac {tY} {2R}} \,$$

where t is the cost of a trip to the bank, R is the nominal interest rate and P and Y are as before.

The key difference between this formulation and the one based on a simple version of Quantity Theory is that now the demand for real balances depends on both income (positively) or the desired level of transactions, and on the nominal interest rate (negatively).

==== Microfoundations for money demand ====
While the Baumol–Tobin model provides a microeconomic explanation for the form of the money demand function, it is generally too stylized to be included in modern macroeconomic models, particularly dynamic stochastic general equilibrium models. As a result, most models of this type resort to simpler indirect methods which capture the spirit of the transactions motive. The two most commonly used methods are the cash-in-advance model (sometimes called the Clower constraint model) and the money-in-the-utility-function (MIU) model (as known as the Sidrauski model).

In the cash-in-advance model agents are restricted to carrying out a volume of transactions equal to or less than their money holdings. In the MIU model, money directly enters agents' utility functions, capturing the 'liquidity services' provided by money.

=== Precautionary demand ===
The precautionary demand for M1 is the holding of transaction funds for use if unexpected needs for immediate expenditure arise.

=== Asset motive ===
The asset motive for the demand for broader monetary measures, M2 and M3, states that people demand money as a way to hold wealth. While it is still assumed that money in the sense of M1 is held in order to carry out transactions, this approach focuses on the potential return on various assets (including money broadly defined) as an additional motivation.

==== Speculative motive ====
John Maynard Keynes, in laying out speculative reasons for holding money, stressed the choice between money and bonds. If agents expect the future nominal interest rate (the return on bonds) to be lower than the current rate they will then reduce their holdings of money and increase their holdings of bonds. If the future interest rate falls, then the price of bonds will increase and the agents will have realized a capital gain on the bonds they purchased. This means that the demand for money in any period will depend on both the current nominal interest rate and the expected future interest rate (in addition to the standard transaction motives which depend on income).

The fact that the current demand for money can depend on expectations of the future interest rates has implications for volatility of money demand. If these expectations are formed, as in Keynes' view, by "animal spirits" they are likely to change erratically and cause money demand to be quite unstable.

==== Portfolio motive ====
The portfolio motive also focuses on demand for money over and above that required for carrying out transactions. The basic framework is due to James Tobin, who considered a situation where agents can hold their wealth in a form of a low risk/low return asset (here, money) or high risk/high return asset (bonds or equity). Agents will choose a mix of these two types of assets (their portfolio) based on the risk-expected return trade-off. For a given expected rate of return, more risk averse individuals will choose a greater share for money in their portfolio. Similarly, given a person's degree of risk aversion, a higher expected return (nominal interest rate plus expected capital gains on bonds) will cause agents to shift away from safe money and into risky assets. Like in the other motivations above, this creates a negative relationship between the nominal interest rate and the demand for money. However, what matters additionally in the Tobin model is the subjective rate of risk aversion, as well as the objective degree of risk of other assets, as, say, measured by the standard deviation of capital gains and losses resulting from holding bonds and/or equity.

== Empirical estimations of money demand functions ==
=== Is money demand stable? ===
Friedman and Schwartz in their 1963 work A Monetary History of the United States argued that the demand for real balances was a function of income and the interest rate. For the time period they were studying this appeared to be true. However, shortly after the publication of the book, due to changes in financial markets and financial regulation money demand became more unstable. Various researchers showed that money demand became much more unstable after 1975. Ericsson, Hendry and Prestwich (1998) consider a model of money demand based on the various motives outlined above and test it with empirical data. The basic model turns out to work well for the period 1878 to 1975 and there doesn't appear to be much volatility in money demand, in a result analogous to that of Friedman and Schwartz. This is true even despite the fact that the two world wars during this time period could have led to changes in the velocity of money. However, when the same basic model is used on data spanning 1976 to 1993, it performs poorly. In particular, money demand appears not to be sensitive to interest rates and there appears to be much more exogenous volatility. The authors attribute the difference to technological innovations in the financial markets, financial deregulation, and the related issue of the changing menu of assets considered in the definition of money. Other researchers confirmed this finding with recent data and over a longer period. Money demand appears to be time varying which also depends on household's real balance effects.

Laurence M. Ball suggests that the use of adapted aggregates, such as near monies, can produce a more stable demand function. He shows that using the return on near monies produced smaller deviations than previous models.

Recent research challenges the view that money demand became fundamentally unstable after 1980. While traditional simple-sum monetary aggregates show unstable relationships with interest rates post-1980, Divisia monetary aggregates - which account for the varying degrees of "moneyness" of different assets - demonstrate stable money demand relationships throughout the period. Belongia and Ireland (2019) and Barnett et al. (2022) find stable money demand relationships using Divisia aggregates, demonstrating that measurement issues with simple-sum aggregates, rather than changes in underlying behavior, explain much of the apparent instability. Chen and Valcarcel (2024) further confirm these findings, showing that properly weighting monetary assets based on their liquidity services and using appropriate price measures (user costs rather than Treasury bill rates) reveals consistent money demand patterns even through periods of financial innovation and zero lower bound interest rates.

== Importance of money demand volatility for monetary policy ==
If the demand for money is stable then a monetary policy which consists of a monetary rule which targets the growth rate of some monetary aggregate (such as M1 or M2) can help to stabilize the economy or at least remove monetary policy as a source of macroeconomic volatility. Additionally, if the demand for money does not change unpredictably then money supply targeting is a reliable way of attaining a constant inflation rate. This can be most easily seen with the quantity theory of money equation given above. When that equation is converted into growth rates we have:

$$g_m+g_v=\pi+g_y \,$$

which says that the growth rate of money supply plus the growth rate of its velocity equals the inflation rate plus the growth rate of real output. If money demand is stable then velocity is constant and $g_v=0$. Additionally, in the long run real output grows at a constant rate equal to the sum of the rates of growth of population, technological know-how, and technology in place, and as such is exogenous. In this case the above equation can be solved for the inflation rate:

$$\pi=-g_y+g_m \,$$

Here, given the long-run output growth rate, the only determinant of the inflation rate is the growth rate of the money supply. In this case inflation in the long run is a purely monetary phenomenon; a monetary policy which targets the money supply can stabilize the economy and ensure a non-variable inflation rate.

This analysis however breaks down if the demand for money is not stable – for example, if velocity in the above equation is not constant. In that case, shocks to money demand under money supply targeting will translate into changes in real and nominal interest rates and result in economic fluctuations. An alternative policy of targeting interest rates rather than the money supply can improve upon this outcome as the money supply is adjusted to shocks in money demand, keeping interest rates (and hence, economic activity) relatively constant.

The above discussion implies that the volatility of money demand matters for how monetary policy should be conducted. If most of the aggregate demand shocks which affect the economy come from the expenditure side, the IS curve, then a policy of targeting the money supply will be stabilizing, relative to a policy of targeting interest rates. However, if most of the aggregate demand shocks come from changes in money demand, which influences the LM curve, then a policy of targeting the money supply will be destabilizing.

== See also ==
- Chartalism
- Diamond–Dybvig model
- Money creation
- Money market
