= DAD–SAS model =

Macroeconomic model

The DAD–SAS model is a macroeconomic model based on the AD-AS model but that looks at the different incomes at different inflation levels.

== DAD curve ==
The DAD (Dynamic aggregate demand) curve is in the long run a horizontal line called the EAD (Equilibrium aggregate Demand) curve. The short run DAD curve at flexible exchange rates is given by the equation:

$\pi=\mu-bY+bY_{-1}+h(\Delta i^W+\Delta \epsilon^e)$

The short run DAD curve at fixed exchange rates is given by the equation:

$\pi=\epsilon+\pi^W-bY+bY_{-1}+\gamma \Delta Y^W+\delta \Delta G-f(\Delta i^W+\Delta \epsilon^e)$

== SAS curve ==
The SAS (Surprise aggregate supply) curve is in the long run a vertical line called the EAS (Equilibrium aggregate Supply) curve. The short run SAS curve is given by the equation:

$\pi=\pi^e+\lambda(Y-Y*)$
