= Nicholas Johannsen =

German economist

Nicholas August Ludwig Jacob Johansen
- Born: 1844; Berlin
- Died: 1928 (aged 83–84); Staten Island, New York City

Academic work
- Discipline: Monetary economics

Nicholas August Ludwig Jacob Johansen (1844–1928) was a German-American amateur economist, today best known for his influence on and citation by John Maynard Keynes. He wrote under two pen names: A. Merwin and J. J. O. Lahn.

== Influence ==
He was largely unrecognized in his lifetime, but following the Keynesian Revolution, he was recognized as one of the most significant influences on The General Theory, and he is cited in Keynes's 1930 Treatise on Money (p. 90). He is credited with devising an early form of effective demand, independent discovery of the multiplier, and less recognized contribution to monetary economics and business cycle theory; (Arestis & Sawyer).

His 1903 Der Kreislauf des Geldes und Mechanismus des Sozial-Lebens (The Circuit Theory of Money, written in German) can be seen as an early work in monetary circuit theory.

Crucially, he distinguished the roles of savings and investment – since only investment is directly productive, savings may be harmful to the economy, and may "tend to impoverish others" – a form of the paradox of thrift.

In his last years (1928), he warned of an upcoming long period of stagnation, which may be seen as prophesying the Great Depression.
