= Marginal propensity to import =

The marginal propensity to import (MPM) is the fractional change in import expenditure that occurs with a change in GDP.

Mathematically, the marginal propensity to import (MPM) function is expressed as the ratio of the import (M) function with respect to GDP (Y).

$\mathrm{MPM}=\frac{\text{Δ}M}{\text{Δ}Y}$

In other words, the marginal propensity to import is measured as the ratio of the change in imports to the change in GDP, thus giving us a figure between 0 and 1.

== See also ==
- Marginal propensity to save
- Marginal propensity to consume
- Automatic stabiliser
- Multiplier model
