= Average propensity to save =

Proportion of income which is saved

The household savings ratio in Australia since 1959

In Keynesian economics, the average propensity to save (APS), also known as the savings ratio, is the proportion of income which is saved, usually expressed for household savings as a fraction of total household disposable income (taxed income).

$APS=\frac{S}{Y}$

The ratio differs considerably over time and between countries. The savings ratio for an entire economy can be affected by (for example) the proportion of older people (as they have less motivation and capability to save), and the rate of inflation (as expectations of rising prices can encourage people to spend now rather than later) or current interest rates. APS can express the social preference for investing in the future over consuming in the present. The complement (1 minus the APS) is the average propensity to consume (APC).

Low average propensity to save might be the indicator of a large percentage of old people or high percentage of irresponsible young people in the population. With income level changes, APS becomes an inexact tool for measuring these changes. So, the marginal propensity to save is used in these cases.

== Characteristics of APS ==
=== Mathematics ===
From the equation:

$Y=C+S$

APS is calculated from the amount of savings as a fraction of income.

$APS=\frac{S}{Y}$

APS can be calculated as total savings divided by the income level for which we want to determine the average propensity to save.

Example 1: The income level is 90 and total savings for that level is 25, then we will get 25/90 as the APS.

Average propensity to save can not be greater than or equal to 1, but APS can be negative, if income is zero and consumption has a positive value.

Example 2: The income is 0 and consumption is 20, so the APS value will be -0.2.

=== Average propensity to save is decreasing ===
As is a fraction of income, an increase in income would make the proportion of saving lower. Also income rises faster than savings so APS tens to decrease as income increase.

=== Marginal propensity to save (MPS) ===
Marginal propensity to save is the proportion of an increase in income devoted to savings. Mathematically, the $\mathit{MPS}$ function is expressed as the derivative of the savings function $S$ with respect to disposable income $Y$, i.e., the instantaneous slope of the $S$-$Y$ curve.

$$\mathit{MPS}=\frac{dS}{dY}$$

or, approximately,

$\mathit{MPS} = \frac{\Delta S}{\Delta Y}$, where $\Delta S$ is the change in savings, and $\Delta Y$ is the change in disposable income that produced the consumption.

== See also ==
- Average propensity to consume
- Marginal propensity to save
- Marginal propensity to consume
- Golden Rule savings rate
- Kinetic exchange models of markets
