= Precautionary demand =

Precautionary demand is the demand for highly liquid financial assets — domestic money or foreign currency — arising from preparedness for emergency expenditures.

== Overview ==
In economic theory, specifically Keynesian economics, precautionary demand is one of the determinants of demand for money (and credit), the others being transactions demand and speculative demand. The precautionary demand for money is the act of holding real balances of money for use in a contingency. As receipts and payments cannot be perfectly foreseen, people hold precautionary balances to minimize the potential loss arising from a contingency.

The precautionary demand is dependent on the size of income, the availability of credit, and the rate of interest. With more income the precautionary demand will increase because there are more likely to be surprises in the timing or size of the correspondingly high expenditures. On the other hand, the more readily available is credit (e.g., the larger is the untapped portion of a credit card's line of credit), the less of a need there is to hold precautionary balances of money. A higher rate of interest represents a higher opportunity cost of holding money for any reason, including the precautionary reason, and so leads to lower precautionary holdings.
