= IS/MP model =

Macroeconomic model

The IS/MP model (Investment–Savings / Monetary–Policy) is a macroeconomic tool which displays short-run fluctuations in the interest rate, inflation and output.

== Formation ==
=== MP curve ===
The MP curve displays a positive relationship, upward-sloping curve, where the real interest rate is located on the vertical axis and inflation rate on the horizontal axis. Shifts on the MP curve are produced by actions of the Federal Reserve. So, a target decrease in the federal funds rate, $\overline i$, shifts the MP curve to the right, which results in a decrease in the real interest rate and an increase in the inflation rate.

=== IS curve ===
An increase in the interest rate, from a leftward shift of the MP curve or higher level of inflation, produces lower total output, Q.

The IS curve displays a negative relationship between the real interest rate, located on the vertical axis, and total output, on the horizontal axis.

Shifts on the IS curve are produced by the actions of the government and consumers. For example, an increase in either consumer or government spending shifts the IS curve rightwards, resulting in an increase in total output for any level of the interest rate.

=== Difference between IS/LM and IS/MP ===
IS-LM is used to describe the equilibrium in two markets — commodity and money. IS-MP is an upgraded version that better reflects the impact of monetary policy and the central bank's role in managing the economy.

== Analysis ==
Example: A lowering of the federal funds target would shift the MP curve to the right, resulting in a lower interest rate, and higher inflation. This lower interest rate results in a downward movement along the IS curve, increasing output.

== Incorporation into larger models ==
The IS/MP model is used as a foundation for the AD–AS model. When used within the AD–AS framework we may derive long-term movements in inflation and interest rates, rather than base, short-run movements.

== Criticism ==
Greg Mankiw maintains the IS/MP model has "quirky features". Mankiw prefers the IS–LM model, for, according to him, it focuses on "important connections between the money supply, interest rates, and economic activity, whereas the IS/MP model leaves some of that in the background".
