= 2015 United Kingdom budget =

There were two budgets held in the United Kingdom in 2015:

- March 2015 United Kingdom budget
- July 2015 United Kingdom budget
