= Accelerator effect =

Positive effect of growth on private fixed investment

The accelerator effect in economics is a positive effect on private fixed investment of the growth of the market economy (measured e.g. by a change in gross domestic product (GDP)). Rising GDP (an economic boom or prosperity) implies that businesses in general see rising profits, increased sales and cash flow, and greater use of existing capacity. This usually implies that profit expectations and business confidence rise, encouraging businesses to build more factories and other buildings and to install more machinery. (This expenditure is called fixed investment.) This may lead to further growth of the economy through the stimulation of consumer incomes and purchases, i.e., via the multiplier effect.

In essence, the accelerator effect proposes that investment levels are contingent on the pace of change in GDP rather than its absolute level. In simpler terms, it is the acceleration or deceleration of economic growth that shapes businesses' choices regarding investments.

The accelerator effect operates in reverse as well: when the GDP declines (entering a recession), it negatively impacts business profits, sales, cash flow, capacity utilization, and expectations. Consequently, these factors discourage businesses from making fixed investments, which further intensifies the recession due to the multiplier effect.

The accelerator effect fits the behavior of an economy best when either the economy is moving away from full employment or when it is already below that level of production. This is because high levels of aggregate demand hit against the limits set by the existing labour force, the existing stock of capital goods, the availability of natural resources, and the technical ability of an economy to convert inputs into products.

== History ==
The accelerator theory concept was mainly given by Thomas Nixon Carver and Albert Aftalion before Keynesian economics came into force, but it came into public knowledge more and more as Keynesian theory began to dominate the field of economics. John Maynard Keynes first introduced the idea in his seminal work "The General Theory of Employment, Interest, and Money," published in 1936. Keynes recognized that changes in investment are not solely driven by interest rates but are also influenced by the level of demand for goods and services.

In the 1940s, American economist Alvin Hansen further developed the accelerator principle. He extended Keynes's ideas and introduced the concept of the "principle of acceleration." Hansen emphasized the role of the accelerator effect in business cycles, showing that fluctuations in investment are a significant driver of economic fluctuations. He proposed that investment decisions are not just influenced by current income or demand levels but are also sensitive to changes in the rate of income growth.

Over time, economists have further refined and expanded upon the accelerator effect in various ways. Some have incorporated additional factors such as technological change, expectations, and financial constraints to enhance the accuracy of investment predictions. However, the accelerator effect has also faced criticism. Some people argued against it because it was thought to remove all the possibility of the demand control through the price control mechanism.

== Multiplier effect vs. acceleration effect ==
The acceleration effect is the phenomenon that a variable moves toward its desired value faster and faster with respect to time. Usually, the variable is the capital stock. In Keynesian models, fixed capital is not in consideration, so the accelerator coefficient becomes the reciprocal of the multiplier and the capital decision degenerates to investment decision. In more general theory, where the capital decision determines the desired level of capital stock (which includes fixed capital and working capital), and the investment decision determines the change of capital stock in a sequences of periods, the acceleration effect emerges as only the current period gap affects the current investment, so do the previous gaps. The Aftalion-Clark accelerator v has such a form $I_{t}=\mu v\sum_{i=1}^{\infty}\left(1-\mu\right)^{i}\left(Y_{t-i}-Y_{t-i-1}\right)$, while the Keynesian multiplier m has such a form $Y_{t}=mI_{t}=\frac{1}{1-MPC}I_{t}$ where MPC is the marginal propensity to consume. The idea of the accelerator has been very well explained by Hayek.

== Business cycles vs. acceleration effect ==
As the acceleration effect dictates that the increase of income accelerates capital accumulation, and the decrease of income accelerates capital depletion (in a simple model), this might cause the system to become unstable or cyclical, and hence many kinds of business cycle models are of this kind (the multiplier-accelerator cycle models).

== Accelerator models ==
The accelerator effect is shown in the simple accelerator model. This model assumes that the stock of capital goods (K) is proportional to the level of production (Y):

K = k×Y

This implies that if k (the capital-output ratio) is constant, an increase in Y requires an increase in K. That is, net investment, I_{n} equals:

I_{n} = k×ΔY

Suppose that k = 2 (usually, k is assumed to be in (0,1)). This equation implies that if Y rises by 10, then net investment will equal 10×2 = 20, as suggested by the accelerator effect. If Y then rises by only 5, the equation implies that the level of investment will be 5×2 = 10. This means that the simple accelerator model implies that fixed investment will fall if the growth of production slows. An actual fall in production is not needed to cause investment to fall. However, such a fall in output will result if slowing growth of production causes investment to fall, since that reduces aggregate demand. Thus, the simple accelerator model implies an endogenous explanation of the business-cycle downturn, the transition to a recession.

Modern economists have described the accelerator effect in terms of the more sophisticated flexible accelerator model of investment. Businesses are described as engaging in net investment in fixed capital goods in order to close the gap between the desired stock of capital goods (K^{d}) and the existing stock of capital goods left over from the past (K_{−1}):

$$I_{n} = x(K^{d} - K_{-1})$$

where x is a coefficient representing the speed of adjustment (1 ≥ x ≥ 0).

$$I_{t}=\mu v\sum_{i=1}^{\infty}\left(1-\mu\right)^{i}\left(Y_{t-i}-Y_{t-i-1}\right)$$

The desired stock of capital goods is determined by such variables as the expected profit rate, the expected level of output, the interest rate (the cost of finance), and technology. Because the expected level of output plays a role, this model exhibits behavior described by the accelerator effect but less extreme than that of the simple accelerator. Because the existing capital stock grows over time due to past net investment, a slowing of the growth of output (GDP) can cause the gap between the desired K and the existing K to narrow, close, or even become negative, causing current net investment to fall.

Obviously, ceteris paribus, an actual fall in output depresses the desired stock of capital goods and thus net investment. Similarly, a rise in output causes a rise in investment. Finally, if the desired capital stock is less than the actual stock, then net investment may be depressed for a long time.

In the neoclassical accelerator model of Jorgenson, the desired capital stock is derived from the aggregate production function assuming profit maximization and perfect competition. In Jorgenson's original model (1963), there is no acceleration effect, since the investment is instantaneous, so the capital stock can jump.

== See also ==
- Multiplier (economics)
- Spending multiplier
- Financial accelerator
