= Marginal propensity to save =

Fraction of income increase that is saved

The marginal propensity to save (MPS) is the fraction of an increase in income that is not spent and instead used for saving. It is the slope of the line plotting saving against income. For example, if a household earns one extra dollar, and the marginal propensity to save is 0.35, then of that dollar, the household will spend 65 cents and save 35 cents. Likewise, it is the fractional decrease in saving that results from a decrease in income.

The MPS plays a central role in Keynesian economics as it quantifies the saving-income relation, which is the flip side of the consumption-income relation, and according to Keynes it reflects the fundamental psychological law. The marginal propensity to save is also a key variable in determining the value of the multiplier.

== Calculation ==
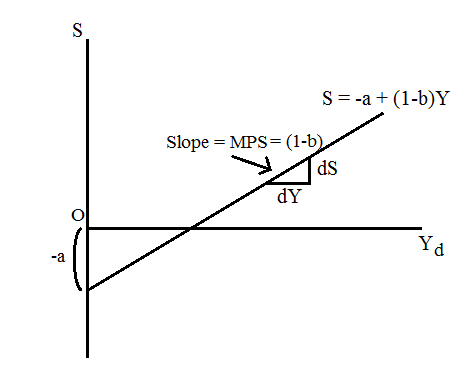
A linear savings function

Marginal propensity to save (MPS) can be calculated as the change in savings (S) divided by the change in disposable income (Y).

$MPS=\frac{\text{Change in Savings}}{\text{Change in Income}} = \frac{\Delta S}{\Delta Y}$ $\big(= \frac{dS}{dY}\big)$

=== Notes ===
1. MPS is the complement of marginal propensity to consume (MPC);
2. MPS oscillates between 0 and 1;
3. MPS can never be negative.

== Multiplier effect ==
=== Mathematical implication ===
The end result is a magnified, multiplied change in aggregate production initially triggered by the change in investment, but amplified by the change in consumption i.e. the initial investment multiplied by the consumption coefficient (Marginal Propensity to consume).

The MPS enters into the process because it indicates the division of extra income between consumption and saving. It determines how much saving is induced with each change in production and income, and thus how much consumption is induced. If the MPS is smaller, then the multiplier process is also greater as less saving is induced, but more consumption is induced, with each round of activity.

Thus, in this highly simplified model, total magnified change in production due to change in an autonomous variable by $1

                 = 
  
    
      
        1
        +
        c
        +
        
          c
          
            2
          
        
        +
        ⋯
        =
        
          
            1
            
              1
              −
              c
            
          
        
        =
        
          
            1
            
              1
              −
              M
              P
              C
            
          
        
        =
        
          
            1
            
              M
              P
              S
            
          
        
      
    
    {\displaystyle 1+c+c^{2}+\cdots ={\frac {1}{1-c}}={\frac {1}{1-MPC}}={\frac {1}{MPS}}}
  

== See also ==
- Marginal propensity to import
- Average propensity to consume
- Average propensity to save
- Fundamental psychological law
