= William Hoban Branson =

American economist (1938–2006)

William H. Branson
- Born: February 14, 1938; Springfield, Illinois
- Died: August 15, 2006 (aged 68); Princeton, New Jersey

Academic background
- Education: Massachusetts Institute of Technology; University of California, Berkeley; United States Naval Academy

Academic work
- Discipline: International economics
- Institutions: Princeton University

William Hoban Branson (February 14, 1938 – August 15, 2006) was an American economist. Considered a pioneer in the field of international economics, he was also noted for his intermediate level textbook Macroeconomic Theory and Policy. William Branson had three children, Kristin, William, and Emily. Shortly before his death his granddaughter was born, Maggie Branson Lynch.

== Selected publications ==
- Branson, W. H.; Rotemberg, J. J. (1980). "International adjustment with wage rigidity" (PDF). European Economic Review. 13 (3): 309–332. doi:10.1016/0014-2921(80)90005-7. S2CID 153468068.
- Branson, W. H.; Halttunen, H.; Masson, P. (1977). "Exchange rates in the short run". European Economic Review. 10 (3): 303–324. doi:10.1016/S0014-2921(77)80002-0.
- Branson, W. H.; Monoyios, N. (1977). "Factor inputs in U.S. Trade". Journal of International Economics. 7 (2): 111–131. doi:10.1016/0022-1996(77)90025-3.
- Branson, William H. (1969). "The Minimum Covered Interest Differential Needed for International Arbitrage Activity". Journal of Political Economy. 77 (6): 1028–1035. doi:10.1086/259590. JSTOR 1837215. S2CID 153958401.
