= Transactions demand =

Transactions demand, in economic theory, specifically Keynesian economics and monetary economics, is one of the determinants of the demand for money, the others being asset demand and precautionary demand.

== Overview ==
The transactions demand for money refers specifically to money narrowly defined to include only its liquid forms, especially cash and checking account balances. This form of money demand arises from the absence of perfect synchronization of payments and receipts. The holding of money is to bridge the gap between payments and receipts. The transactions demand for money is motivated by the need to facilitate daily transactions by consumers, businesses, and governments.

The transactions demand for money is one component of the overall demand for money. The other components are the asset or speculative demand and the precautionary demand.

The transactions demand for money is positively affected by the amount of real income and expenditure, and negatively affected by the interest rate on alternative assets, which is the opportunity cost of holding money for any reason. It also depends on the timing of expenditures and the length of the payment period.

The Baumol-Tobin model focuses on the optimal number of times that funds are moved from other assets into money per unit of time, which dictates the transactions balances held on average over time.
