= Alvin Hansen =

American economist (1887–1975)

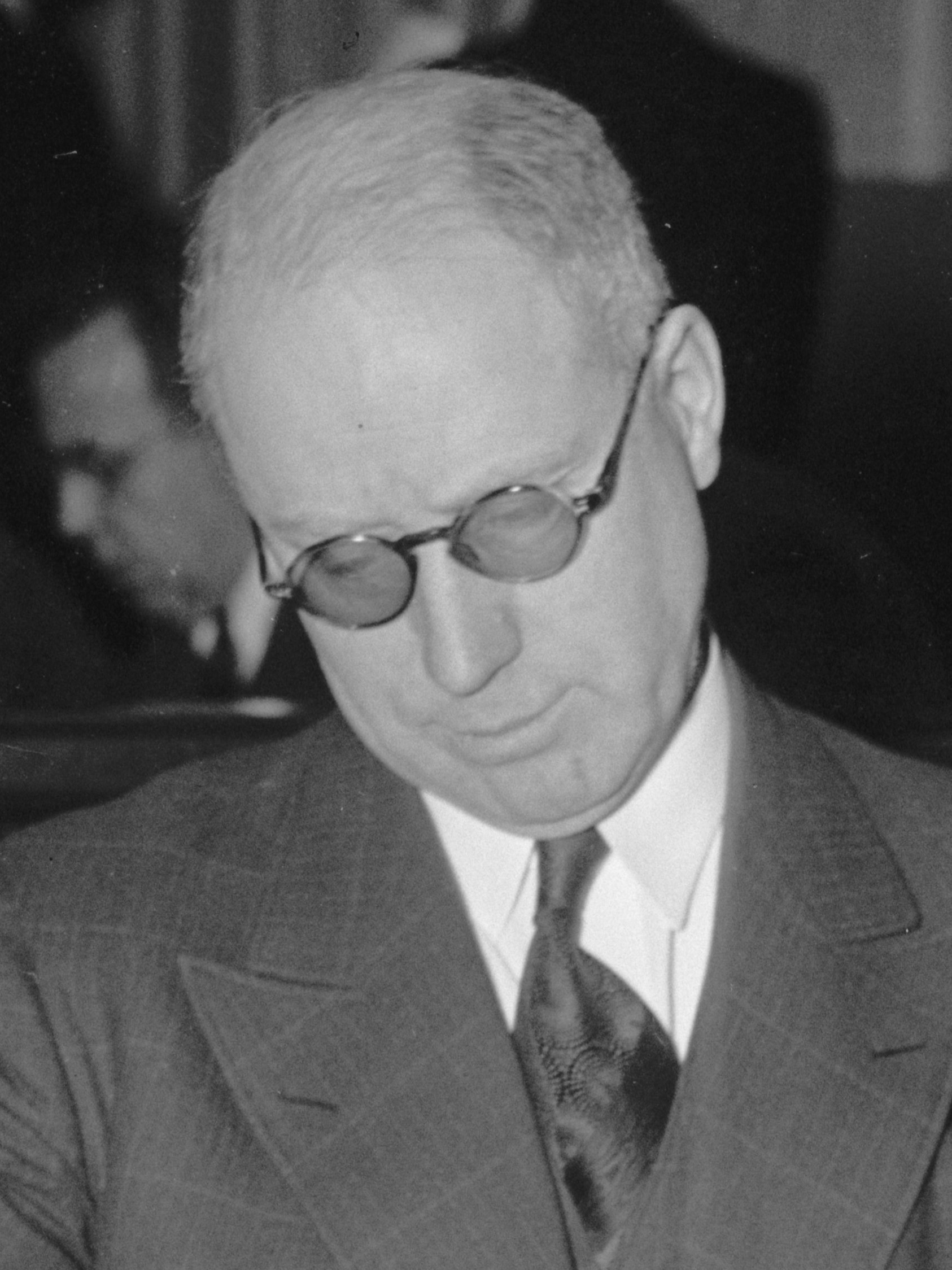
- Hansen in 1938
- Born: August 23, 1887; Viborg, South Dakota, US
- Died: June 6, 1975 (aged 87); Alexandria, Virginia, US

Academic background
- Education: University of Wisconsin–Madison; Yankton College
- Influences: John Maynard Keynes

Academic work
- Discipline: Macroeconomics, political economics
- School or tradition: Neo-Keynesian economics
- Institutions: Harvard University
- Notable ideas: IS–LM model (Hicks–Hansen synthesis); Secular stagnation theory
- Scientific career
- Thesis: Cycles of prosperity and depression in the United States, Great Britain and Germany; a study of monthly data 1902-1908 (1918)
- Doctoral advisor: Richard T. Ely; John R. Commons; Frederic L. Paxson
- Doctoral students: Evsey Domar; Eva Mueller; Hyman Minsky; Richard Musgrave; Lloyd Metzler

Alvin Harvey Hansen (August 23, 1887 – June 6, 1975) was an American economist who taught at the University of Minnesota and was later a chair professor of economics at Harvard University. Often referred to as "the American Keynes", he was a widely read popular author on economic issues, and an influential advisor to the government on economic policy. Hansen helped create the Council of Economic Advisors and the Social Security system. He is best remembered today for introducing Keynesian economics in the United States in the 1930s and 40s.

More effectively than anyone else, he explicated, extended, domesticated, and popularized the ideas embodied in Keynes's The General Theory. He helped develop with John Hicks the IS–LM model (or Hicks–Hansen model), a mathematical representation of Keynesian macroeconomic theory. In 1967, Paul McCracken, chairman of the President's Council of Economic Advisers, saluted Hansen stating: "It is certainly a statement of fact that you have influenced the nation's thinking about economic policy more profoundly than any other economist in this century."

== Early life and education ==
Hansen was born in Viborg, South Dakota on August 23, 1887, the son of Niels Hansen, a farmer, and Marie Bergitta Nielsen. Graduating from the nearby Yankton College (closed in 1984) in 1910 with a major in English, he enrolled in the University of Wisconsin-Madison in 1913 to study economics under Richard Ely and John R. Commons, from whom he learned to use economics to address pressing social problems. Upon completion of the coursework for the PhD in 1916. Hansen married Mabel Lewis: they had two children.

== Academic career ==
He taught at Brown University while writing his doctoral dissertation, "Cycles of Prosperity and Depression". Upon completion of the dissertation in 1918 (published in 1921), he moved back west to the University of Minnesota in 1919, where he rose quickly through the ranks of a full teacher in 1923. Subsequently, his Business Cycle Theory (1927) and his introductory text Principles of Economics (1928, with Frederic Garver) brought him to the attention of the wider economics profession. His Economic Stabilization in an Unbalanced World (1932), written with the help of a Guggenheim grant that funded travel in Europe during 1928–1929, established Hansen in the broader circle of public affairs. He was elected as a Fellow of the American Statistical Association in 1932. He also worked for the Economic and Financial Organization of the League of Nations.

In 1937 he received an invitation to occupy the new Lucius N. Littauer Chair of political Economy at Harvard University. His first book at Harvard posed the question Full Recovery or Stagnation? (1938) sketched the outlines of what came to be called the "secular stagnation thesis".

Later, his America's Role in the World Economy (1945) and Economic Policy and Full Employment (1947) made this case to a wider public. Hansen was appointment as special economic adviser to Marriner Eccles at the Federal Reserve Board in 1940 and he was in charge until 1945.

After retiring from active teaching in 1956, he wrote The American Economy (1957), Economic Issues of the 1960s and Problems (1964), and The Dollar and the International Monetary System (1965). He died in Alexandria, Virginia on June 6 of 1975 at the age of 87 years.

== Theories ==
His most outstanding contribution to economic theory was the joint development, with John Hicks, of the so-called IS–LM model, also known as the "Hicks–Hansen synthesis." The IS–LM diagram claims to show the relationship between the investment-saving (IS) curve and the liquidity preference-money supply (LM) curve. It is used in mainstream economics literature and textbooks to illustrate how monetary and fiscal policy can influence GDP.

Hansen's book of 1938, Full Recovery or Stagnation. based in Keynes's General Theory, presents his thesis for both growth and employment being stagnant if there is no economic state intervention to stimulate demand.

Hansen presented evidence on several occasions before the U.S. Congress to oppose the use of unemployment as the main means of fighting inflation. He advocated instead that inflation could be controlled by changes in interest- and tax-rates as well as controls on prices and wages.

Lately, theories of economic stagnation have become more associated with Hansen's ideas than with those of Keynes.

=== Keynesianism ===
Hansen, in his review of The General Theory of Employment, Interest and Money, was skeptical of John Maynard Keynes's propositions, but by December 1938, in his presidential address to the American Economic Association, he embraced Keynesian theories of the need for government intervention in periods of economic recession. Soon after his arrival at Harvard in 1937, Hansen's famous graduate seminar on fiscal policy began inspiring graduate students such as Paul Samuelson and James Tobin (both of whom would go on to win the Economics Nobel) to further develop and popularize Keynesian economics. Hansen's 1941 book, Fiscal Policy and Business Cycles, was the first major work in the United States to entirely support Keynes's analysis of the causes of the Great Depression. Hansen used that analysis to argue for Keynesian deficit spending.

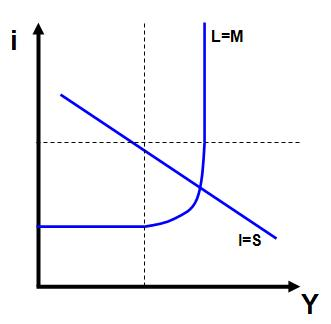
IS–LM model, displaying interest rates (i) on the y-axis and national income or production (Y) on the x-axis

Hansen's best known contribution to economics was his and John Hicks's development of the IS–LM model, also known as the "Hicks–Hansen synthesis." The framework claims to graphically represent the investment-savings (IS) curve and the liquidity-money supply (LM) curve as an illustration of how fiscal and monetary policies can be employed to alter national income.

Hansen's 1938 book, Full Recovery or Stagnation, was based on Keynesian ideas and was an extended argument that there would be long-term employment stagnation without government demand-side intervention.

Paul Samuelson was Hansen's most famous student. Samuelson credited Hansen's Full Recovery or Stagnation? (1938) as the main inspiration for his famous multiplier-accelerator model of 1939. Leeson (1997) shows that while Hansen and Sumner Slichter continued to be regarded as leading exponents of Keynesian economics, their gradual abandonment of a commitment to price stability contributed to the development of a Keynesianism that conflicted with positions of Keynes himself.

=== Stagnation ===
In the late 1930s, Hansen argued that "secular stagnation" had set in so the American economy would never grow rapidly again because all the growth ingredients had played out, including technological innovation and population growth. The only solution, he argued, was constant, large-scale deficit spending by the federal government.

The thesis was highly controversial, as critics, such as George Terborgh, attacked Hansen as a "pessimist" and a "defeatist." Hansen replied that secular stagnation was just another name for Keynes's underemployment equilibrium. However, the sustained economic growth, beginning in 1940, undercut Hansen's predictions and his stagnation model was forgotten.

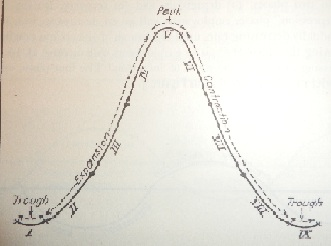

=== Economic cycles ===
One of the most important contribution to the economic theory by Alvin Hansen are the economic cycles. In his book Business Cycles and National Income, he defines the cycle as a fluctuation in: employment, output, and prices. The cycle is divided in two phases: expansion, extending from trough to peak; and contraction, extending from peak to trough.

For Hansen, there exist stable and unstable economic cycles. The instability is caused by displacement due to external shocks. Hansen claims that the business-cycle analysis must take into consideration technical progress, the money market, and expectations.

== Public policy ==
Hansen argued that the American economy during the Great Depression was not going through a particularly severe business cycle but through the exhaustion of a longer-term progressive dynamic. What Hansen had in mind was not just counter-cyclical public spending to stabilize employment but rather major projects such as rural electrification, slum clearance, and natural resource development conservation, all with a view of opening up new investment opportunities for the private sector and so, restoring the economic dynamism needed to the system as a whole.

Hansen trained and arguably influenced numerous students, many of whom later held government posts, and he served on numerous governmental committees dealing with economic issues. The American Economic Association awarded him its Walker Medal in 1967.

Hansen frequently testified before Congress. He advocated against using unemployment to control inflation. He argued that inflation could be managed by timely changes in tax rates and the money supply, and by effective wage and price controls. He also advocated fiscal and other stimuli to ward off the stagnation that he thought was endemic to mature, industrialized economies. Hansen was not without his critics, however; journalist John T. Flynn, for example, argued that Hansen's policies were de facto fascism, sharing alarming similarities with the economic policy of Benito Mussolini, the dictator of Italy.

During the Roosevelt and Truman presidencies, Hansen served on government commissions and as consultant to the Federal Reserve Board, the United States Department of the Treasury and the National Security Resources Board. In 1935, he helped create the US Social Security system and, in 1946, he assisted in the drafting of the Full Employment Act, which, among other things, created the Council of Economic Advisors.

Between 1939 and 1945, he served as co-rapporteur to the economic and financial group of the Council on Foreign Relations's War and Peace Studies project, along with Chicago economist Jacob Viner.

Hansen's advocacy (with Luther Gulick) during World War II of Keynesian policies to promote post-war full employment helped persuade Keynes to assist in the development of plans for the international economy.
