= Secular stagnation =

Absence of long-term economic growth

In economics, secular stagnation is a condition when there is negligible or no economic growth in a market-based economy. In this context, the term secular means long-term (from Latin "saeculum"—century or lifetime), and is used in contrast to cyclical or short-term. It suggests a change of fundamental dynamics which would play out only in its own time. The concept was originally put forth by Alvin Hansen in 1938. According to The Economist, it was used to "describe what he feared was the fate of the American economy following the Great Depression of the early 1930s: a check to economic progress as investment opportunities were stunted by the closing of the frontier and the collapse of immigration". Warnings of impending secular stagnation have been issued after all deep recessions since the Great Depression, but the hypothesis has remained controversial.

== Definition ==
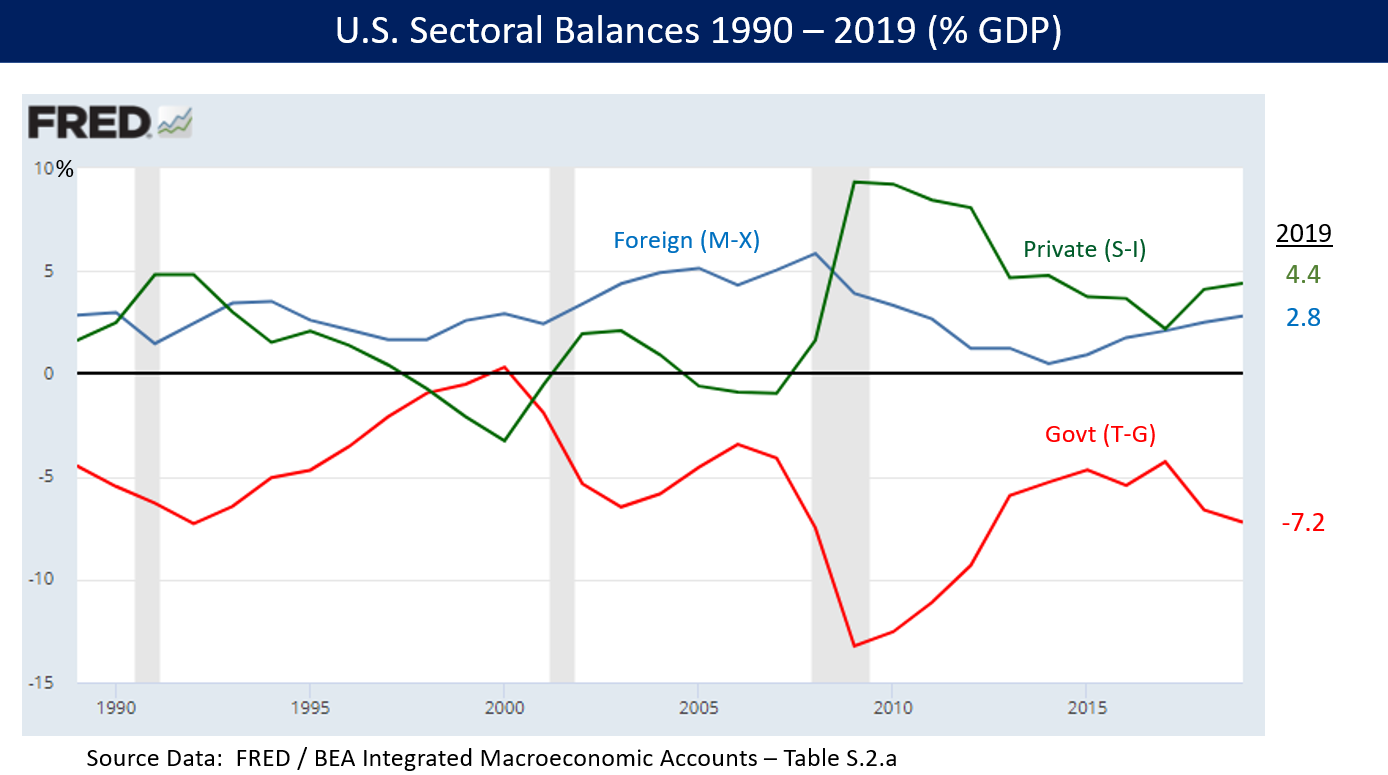
Sectoral balances in U.S. economy 1990–2017. By definition, the three balances must net to zero. The green line indicates a private sector surplus, where savings exceeds investment. Since 2008, the foreign sector surplus and private sector surplus have been offset by a government budget deficit.

The term secular stagnation refers to a market economy with a chronic (secular or long-term) lack of demand. Historically, a booming economy with low unemployment and high GDP growth (i.e., an economy at or above capacity) would generate inflation in wages and products. However, an economy facing secular stagnation behaves as if it is operating below capacity, even when the economy appears to be booming; inflation does not appear. In a healthy economy, if household savings exceed business investments, interest rates fall; lower interest rates stimulate spending and investment, which bring savings and investments into balance. However, an economy facing secular stagnation may require an interest rate below zero to bring savings and investment into balance. The surplus of savings over investment may be generating price appreciation in financial assets or real estate. For example, the U.S. had low unemployment but low inflation in the years leading up to the Great Recession, although a massive housing bubble developed.

The idea of secular stagnation dates back to the Great Depression, when some economists feared that the United States had permanently entered a period of low growth. The Economist explained in 2018 that many factors may contribute to secular stagnation, by either driving up savings or reducing investment. Households paying down debt (i.e., deleveraging) increase savings and are spending less; businesses react to the lack of demand by investing less. This was a major factor in the slow U.S. GDP growth during 2009-2012 following the Great Recession. Another cause is income inequality, which shifts more money to the wealthy, who hoard it rather than spend it, thus increasing savings, driving up financial asset prices, and causing a liquidity trap. Aging populations (which spend less per capita) and a slowdown in productivity may also increase savings. Central banks face a difficult dilemma; do they raise interest rates to ward off inflation (e.g., implement monetary policy austerity) assuming the economy is in a cyclical boom, or assume the economy (even if temporarily booming) is in secular stagnation and therefore take a more stimulative approach?

== 1980s ==
An analysis of stagnation and what is now called financialization was provided in the 1980s by Harry Magdoff and Paul Sweezy, coeditors of the independent socialist journal Monthly Review. Magdoff was a former economic advisor to Vice President Henry A. Wallace in Roosevelt’s New Deal administration, while Sweezy was a former Harvard economics professor. In their 1987 book, Stagnation and the Financial Explosion, they argued, based on Keynes, Hansen, Michał Kalecki, and Marx, and marshaling extensive empirical data, that, contrary to the usual way of thinking, stagnation or slow growth was the norm for mature, monopolistic (or oligopolistic) economies, while rapid growth was the exception.

Private accumulation had a strong tendency to weak growth and high levels of excess capacity and unemployment/underemployment, which could, however, be countered in part by such exogenous factors as state spending (military and civilian), epoch-making technological innovations (for example, the automobile in its expansionary period), and the growth of finance. In the 1980s and 1990s Magdoff and Sweezy argued that a financial explosion of long duration was lifting the economy, but this would eventually compound the contradictions of the system, producing ever bigger speculative bubbles, and leading eventually to a resumption of overt stagnation.

== 2008–2009 ==
Economists have asked whether the low economic growth rate in the developed world leading up to and following the subprime mortgage crisis of 2007-2008 was due to secular stagnation. Paul Krugman wrote in September 2013: "[T]here is a case for believing that the problem of maintaining adequate aggregate demand is going to be very persistent – that we may face something like the 'secular stagnation' many economists feared after World War II." Krugman wrote that fiscal policy stimulus and higher inflation (to achieve a negative real rate of interest necessary to achieve full employment) may be potential solutions.

Larry Summers presented his view during November 2013 that secular (long-term) stagnation may be a reason that U.S. growth is insufficient to reach full employment: "Suppose then that the short term real interest rate that was consistent with full employment [i.e., the "natural rate"] had fallen to negative two or negative three percent. Even with artificial stimulus to demand you wouldn't see any excess demand. Even with a resumption in normal credit conditions you would have a lot of difficulty getting back to full employment."

Robert J. Gordon wrote in August 2012: "Even if innovation were to continue into the future at the rate of the two decades before 2007, the U.S. faces six headwinds that are in the process of dragging long-term growth to half or less of the 1.9 percent annual rate experienced between 1860 and 2007. These include demography, education, inequality, globalization, energy/environment, and the overhang of consumer and government debt. A provocative 'exercise in subtraction' suggests that future growth in consumption per capita for the bottom 99 percent of the income distribution could fall below 0.5 percent per year for an extended period of decades".

== Post-2009 ==
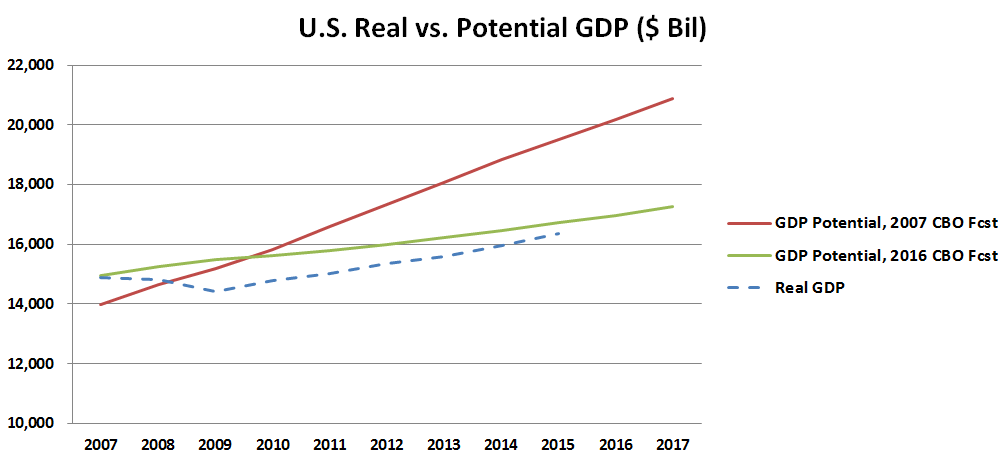
This chart compares U.S. potential GDP under two CBO forecasts (one from 2007 and one from 2016) versus the actual real GDP. It is based on a similar diagram from economist Larry Summers from 2014.

Secular stagnation was dusted off by Hans-Werner Sinn in a 2009 article dismissing the threat of inflation, and became popular again when Larry Summers invoked the term and concept during a 2013 speech at the IMF.

However, The Economist criticizes secular stagnation as "a baggy concept, arguably too capacious for its own good". Warnings of impending secular stagnation have been issued after all deep recessions, but turned out to be wrong because they underestimated the potential of existing technologies.

Paul Krugman, writing in 2014, clarified that it refers to "the claim that underlying changes in the economy, such as slowing growth in the working-age population, have made episodes like the past five years in Europe and the United States, and the last 20 years in Japan, likely to happen often. That is, we will often find ourselves facing persistent shortfalls of demand, which can’t be overcome even with near-zero interest rates." At its root is "the problem of building consumer demand at a time when people are less motivated to spend".

One theory is that the boost in growth by the internet and technological advancement in computers of the new economy does not measure up to the boost caused by the great inventions of the past. An example of such a great invention is the assembly line production method of Fordism. The general form of the argument has been the subject of papers by Robert J. Gordon. It has also been written about by Owen. C. Paepke and Tyler Cowen.

Secular stagnation has also been linked to the rise of the digital economy. Carl Benedikt Frey, for example, has suggested that digital technologies are much less capital-absorbing, creating only little new investment demand relative to other revolutionary technologies.

Another is that the damage done by the Great Recession was so long-lasting and permanent, so many workers will never get jobs again, that we really can't recover.

A third is that there is a "persistent and disturbing reluctance of businesses to invest and consumers to spend", perhaps in part because so much of the recent gains have gone to the people at the top, and they tend to save more of their money than people—ordinary working people who can't afford to do that.

A fourth is that advanced economies are just simply paying the price for years of inadequate investment in infrastructure and education, the basic ingredients of growth.

A fifth is related to decreased fertility and increased longevity, thus changes in the demographic structure in advanced economies, affecting both demand, through increased savings, and supply, through reduced innovation activities.

And a sixth is that economic growth is largely related to the concept of energy returned on energy invested (EROEI), or energy surplus, which with the discovery of fossil fuels shot up to very high and historically unprecedented levels. This allowed, and in effect fueled, dramatic increases in human consumption since the Industrial Revolution and many related technological advances. Under this argument, diminishing and increasingly difficult to access fossil fuel reserves directly lead to significantly reduced EROEI, and therefore put a brake on, and potentially reverse, long-term economic growth, leading to secular stagnation. Linked to the EROEI argument are those stemming from the Limits to Growth school of thinking, whereby environmental and resource constraints in general are likely to impose an eventual limit on the continued expansion of human consumption and incomes. While 'limits to growth' thinking went out of fashion in the decades following the initial publication in 1972, a recent study shows human development continues to align well with the 'overshoot and collapse' projection outlined in the standard run of the original analysis, and this is before factoring in the potential effects of climate change.

A 2018 CUSP working paper by Tim Jackson, The Post-Growth Challenge, argues that low growth rates might in fact be ‘the new normal’.

== See also ==
- Biflation
- Business cycle
- Economic stagnation
- Era of Stagnation
- The Limits to Growth
- Productivity
- Prosperity Without Growth
- Recession
- Secular at etymonoline
- Self-fulfilling prophecy
- Sunspots (economics)
- Stagflation
- Zero lower bound
