= Speculative demand for money =

Component of liquidity preference theory

The speculative or asset demand for money is the demand for highly liquid financial assets — domestic money or foreign currency — that is not dictated by real transactions such as trade or consumption expenditure. Speculative demand arises from the perception that money is optimally part of a portfolio of assets being held as investments.

== Overview ==
In economic theory, specifically Keynesian economics, speculative demand is one of the determinants of demand for money (and credit), the others being transactions demand and precautionary demand.

Speculative demand is the holding of real balances for the purpose of avoiding capital loss from holding bonds or stocks. The net return on bonds is the sum of the interest payments and the capital gains (or losses) from their varying market value. A rise in interest rates causes aftermarket bond prices to fall, and that implies a capital loss from holding bonds. Accordingly, the return on bonds can be negative. Thus, people may hold money to avoid the loss from bonds. Money is thus treated as a form of asset for storing wealth.

The asset demand for money is inversely related to the market interest rate. This is because at a lower interest rate, more people will expect a rise in the interest rate (and thus a fall in aftermarket bond prices). As a result, more people will hold their wealth in money rather than bonds, i.e. the speculative balances will be greater at a lower interest rate. It also depends on investors' aversion to risk, the relative demand for and the supply of other financial assets and real assets, and the change in expectations of the economic climate.

== See also ==
- Demand for money
