= Marginal propensity to consume =

Metric that quantifies induced consumption

In economics, the marginal propensity to consume (MPC) is a metric that quantifies induced consumption, the concept that the increase in personal consumer spending (consumption) occurs with an increase in disposable income (income after taxes and transfers). The proportion of disposable income which individuals spend on consumption is known as propensity to consume. MPC is the proportion of additional income that an individual consumes. For example, if a household earns one extra dollar of disposable income, and the marginal propensity to consume is 0.65, then of that dollar, the household will spend 65 cents and save 35 cents. Obviously, the household cannot spend more than the extra dollar (without borrowing or using savings). If the extra money accessed by the individual gives more economic confidence, then the MPC of the individual may well exceed 1, as they may borrow or utilise savings.

According to John Maynard Keynes, marginal propensity to consume is less than one. The MPC is higher in the case of poorer people than in rich.

== Background ==
Mathematically, the $\mathit{MPC}$ function is expressed as the derivative of the consumption function $C$ with respect to disposable income $Y$, i.e., the instantaneous slope of the $C$-$Y$ curve.

$$\mathit{MPC}=\frac{dC}{dY}$$

or, approximately,

$\mathit{MPC} = \frac{\Delta C}{\Delta Y}$, where $\Delta C$ is the change in consumption, and $\Delta Y$ is the change in disposable income that produced the consumption.

Marginal propensity to consume can be found by dividing change in consumption by a change in income, or $\mathit{MPC}=\Delta C/\Delta Y$. The MPC can be explained with a simple example:

Income	Consumption
120	120
180	170

Here $\Delta C= 50$; $\Delta Y= 60$ Therefore, $\mathit{MPC}=\Delta C/\Delta Y= 50/60= 0.83$ or 83%. For example, suppose you receive a bonus with your paycheck, and it's $500 on top of your normal annual earnings. You suddenly have $500 more in income than you did before. If you decide to spend $400 of this marginal increase in income on a new business suit, your marginal propensity to consume will be 0.8 ($\$400/\$500$).

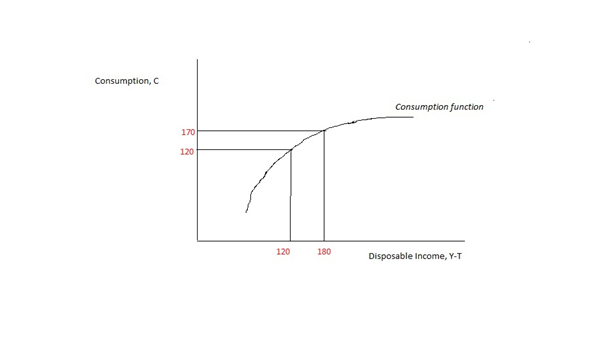

The marginal propensity to consume is measured as the ratio of the change in consumption to the change in income, thus giving us a figure between 0 and 1. The MPC can be more than one if the subject borrowed money or dissaved to finance expenditures higher than their income. The MPC can also be less than zero if an increase in income leads to a reduction in consumption (which might occur if, for example, the increase in income makes it worthwhile to save up for a particular purchase). One minus the MPC equals the marginal propensity to save (in a two sector closed economy), which is crucial to Keynesian economics and a key variable in determining the value of the multiplier. In symbols, we have:$\frac{\Delta C}{\Delta Y} + \frac{\Delta S}{\Delta Y} = 1$.

In a standard Keynesian model, the MPC is less than the average propensity to consume (APC) because in the short-run some (autonomous) consumption does not change with income. Falls (increases) in income do not lead to reductions (increases) in consumption because people reduce (add to) savings to stabilize consumption. Over the long-run, as wealth and income rise, consumption also rises; the marginal propensity to consume out of long-run income is closer to the average propensity to consume.

The MPC is not strongly influenced by interest rates; consumption tends to be stable relative to income. In theory one might think that higher interest rates would induce more saving (the substitution effect) but higher interest rates also mean than people do not have to save as much for the future.

Economists often distinguish between the marginal propensity to consume out of permanent income, and the average propensity to consume out of temporary income, because if consumers expect a change in income to be permanent, then they have a greater incentive to increase their consumption. This implies that the Keynesian multiplier should be larger in response to permanent changes in income than it is in response to temporary changes in income (though the earliest Keynesian analyses ignored these subtleties). However, the distinction between permanent and temporary changes in income is often subtle in practice, and it is often quite difficult to designate a particular change in income as being permanent or temporary. What is more, the marginal propensity to consume should also be affected by factors such as the prevailing interest rate and the general level of consumer surplus that can be derived from purchasing.

== See also ==
- Average propensity to save
- Average propensity to consume
- Consumer choice
- Keynesian economics
- Marginal propensity to save
