= Economic policy =

Actions that governments take in the economic field

Economic policy is the set of government actions setting levels of taxation, government budgets, the money supply and interest rates, regulation of the labour market, and other actions that can affect the economy. Economic policy is a broad term for both the goals governments pursue and the tools they use.

Most economic policy instruments can be divided into either fiscal policy, which deals with government revenue and expenditure decisions, or monetary policy, which deals with central banking actions regarding the money supply and interest rates. In addition, governments shape economies through industrial policy, regulatory frameworks, redistribution through taxes and transfers, and trade policy. At the international level, institutions such as the International Monetary Fund and World Bank shape policy formulation.

The intellectual foundations of economic policy have shifted dramatically across history. Mercantilist doctrines dominated European states from the seventeenth century until challenged by classical economists such as Adam Smith. The Great Depression of the 1930s discredited laissez-faire orthodoxy and gave rise to Keynesian demand management, which itself came under attack during the stagflation of the 1970s. The late twentieth century saw a turn toward inflation targeting central banks, fiscal rules, and market liberalization, while the 2008 financial crisis and the COVID-19 pandemic of 2020 prompted a scale of government intervention not seen since the postwar era.

A persistent challenge in economic policy is that desirable goals often conflict. Policies that reduce unemployment can raise inflation, and expansionary fiscal policy can crowd out private investment. These trade-offs remain central concerns in economic debates along with whether policy should be based on rules or discretion.

== Types of economic policy ==
=== Fiscal policy ===
Fiscal policy encompasses government decisions about taxation and public expenditure. It is grounded primarily in Keynesian economics, which holds that aggregate demand drives output and employment in the short run. With private demand shortfalls in a recession, the government can sustain activity as a spender of last resort by running a deficit.

The fiscal stance describes whether the overall budget is expansionary (in deficit, injecting demand into the economy) or contractionary (in surplus, withdrawing it). Fiscal adjustment occurs through automatic stabilizers, with tax revenues falling and unemployment benefits rising, absorbing economic fluctuations without legislative action. Discretionary fiscal measures such as stimulus packages sit on top of this automatic layer.

Critics of expansionary fiscal policy raise two main arguments. The Ricardian equivalence proposes that rational households will anticipate future tax increases to repay government debt, reducing the intended effect. The crowding out argument holds that government borrowing drives up interest rates, discouraging private investment and lessening the fiscal stimulus. Proponents of fiscal policy argue that government spending multipliers are typically higher during downturns. Empirical evidence is mixed, with the size of fiscal multipliers varying substantially.

Government spending encompasses public investment in infrastructure, education, and health that promotes productivity capabilities, as well as current spending on transfer payments. Tax policy involves the balance between direct taxes on income and wealth and indirect taxes on consumption, and the degree of progressivity: in which higher earners pay a larger share of their income. These distributional choices are subject to political disagreement.

=== Monetary policy ===
Monetary policy is conducted by a country's central bank, primarily by manipulating short-term interest rates. When inflation is high, central banks may raise interest rates to fight inflation. When the economy is weak, central banks often lower interest rates, stimulating bank lending.

- Interest rates: influence the money supply through commercial bank creation of customer deposits.
- Open market operations: the central bank buys government securities to increase the money supply, or sells to reduce it.
- Quantitative easing: purchasing assets as stimulus when interest rates are near zero.
- Forward guidance: central bank communications about future policy intentions, used to affect market expectations.

Since the late 1990s, most developed countries have granted central bank independence to avoid political pressure.

The proper role of the government in the economy is an important political matter. A few examples of the kinds of economic policies that exist include:

- Macroeconomic stabilization policy, which attempts to smooth out the business cycle.
- Fiscal policy includes government actions of spending, taxation, and borrowing.
- Monetary policy, where central bank interest rates influence the money supply.
- Trade policy, which refers to tariffs, trade agreements, and the international institutions that govern them.
- Development policy, promoting long-run economic growth, particularly in lower-income countries.
- Policies dealing with the redistribution of income through taxes and transfers.
- Supply-side economics, affecting technology investment, labour markets, and regulatory policy.

Stabilization policy attempts to dampen the price and employment fluctuations of the business cycle. It includes both fiscal and monetary policies.

== Policy goals and instruments ==
Economic policy is directed toward specific outcomes that policymakers seek to achieve.

Goals include:

- Full employment: minimizing involuntary unemployment.
- Price stability: the range of goods one can acquire with their available financial resources.
- Economic growth: steady and adequate growth in national income.
- Balance of payments equilibrium: maintaining a stable exchange rate
- Distributional equity: reducing inequality in incomes or wealth.

To pursue these goals, governments and central banks use policy instruments or tools including tariffs, tax rates, and regulatory standards.

=== Constraints and trade-offs ===
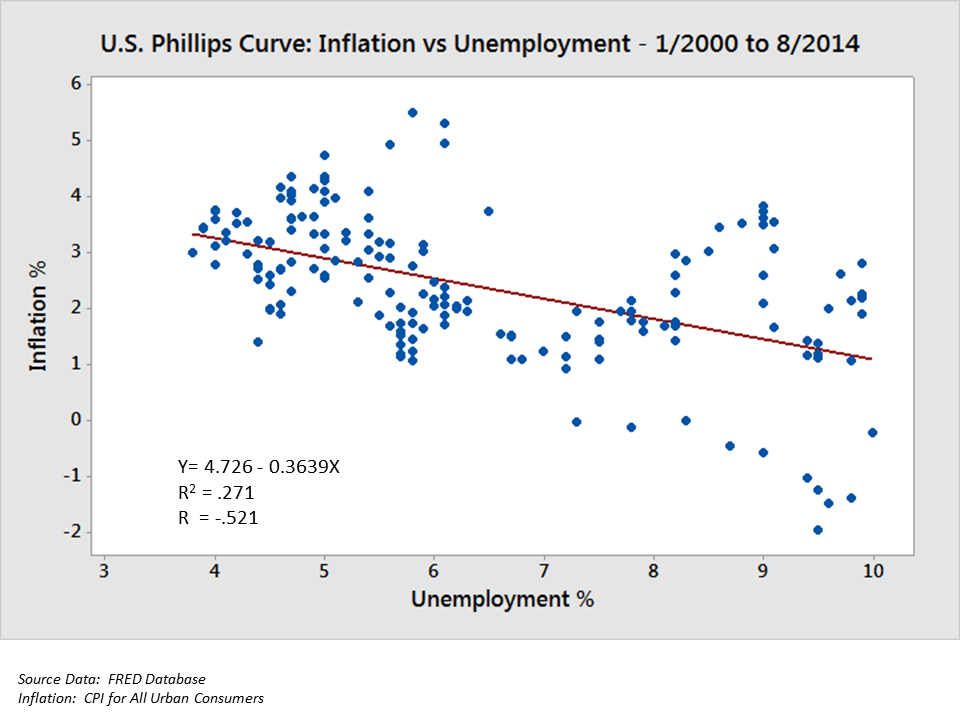
Diagram shows the relationship between inflation and the unemployment rate, also called the Phillips Curve

A fundamental challenge in economic policy is conflicting goals, such as the trade-offs among high economic growth, low unemployment, and low inflation. Though the Phillips curve's trade-off between inflation and unemployment is unstable over the long run, trade-offs between policy decisions remain a central concern.

=== Demand-side vs. supply-side tools ===
Macroeconomic stabilization has traditionally relied on demand-side tools that influence aggregate demand. Without accompanying supply-side reforms, such as unemployment insurance, job protection legislation or labour-market regulations, monetary expansion will likely only cause wage and price increases.

== Discretionary policy vs policy rules ==
A long-running debate concerns whether policy should be based on rules or discretionary. Discretionary policy allows for flexible response to unforeseen developments, but may suffer from dynamic inconsistency. If policymakers announce one policy but do another, the public may anticipate reversals, making policy less effective.

Rule-based policies improve credibility with more predictable central bank behavior.

- Fixed exchange rate regimes: maintaining a fixed rate against a reserve currency.
- Inflation targeting: keeping inflation within a band.
- Fiscal rules: constitutional or statutory constraints on deficits or debts such as a balanced budget law.
- Golden Rule: allowing debt only to finance investment.

Discretion may be delegated to an independent central bank with a mandate. The central bank then faces a trade-off between discretion and credibility.

== History of economic policy ==
=== Ancient and medieval periods ===
Ancient governments covered expenditures by levying forms of taxation such as corvée forced labour. Egyptian grain taxes paid workers conscripted to build temples and pyramids.

With the development of coins, rulers could also raise revenue through debasement, reducing precious metal content of coins. Typically inflation followed debasement as people demanded more coins for the same amount of goods. Ptolemaic Egypt imposed a monetary monopoly, profiting from foreign coinage exchanged for local currency with an indirect protective tariff.

=== Mercantilism and early modern policy ===
From the seventeenth to mid nineteenth century, mercantilism was the dominant European economic policy, aiming to build wealth by imposing high tariffs on manufactured imports. Beginning in 1651, the English Navigation Acts restricted shipping from the colonies except on English vessels.

Mercantilist thought was challenged by the classical economists. Adam Smith in The Wealth of Nations argued that nations benefit from trade and specialization, with David Ricardo introducing comparative advantage, constituting pillars of classic free trade theory.

=== Gold standard ===
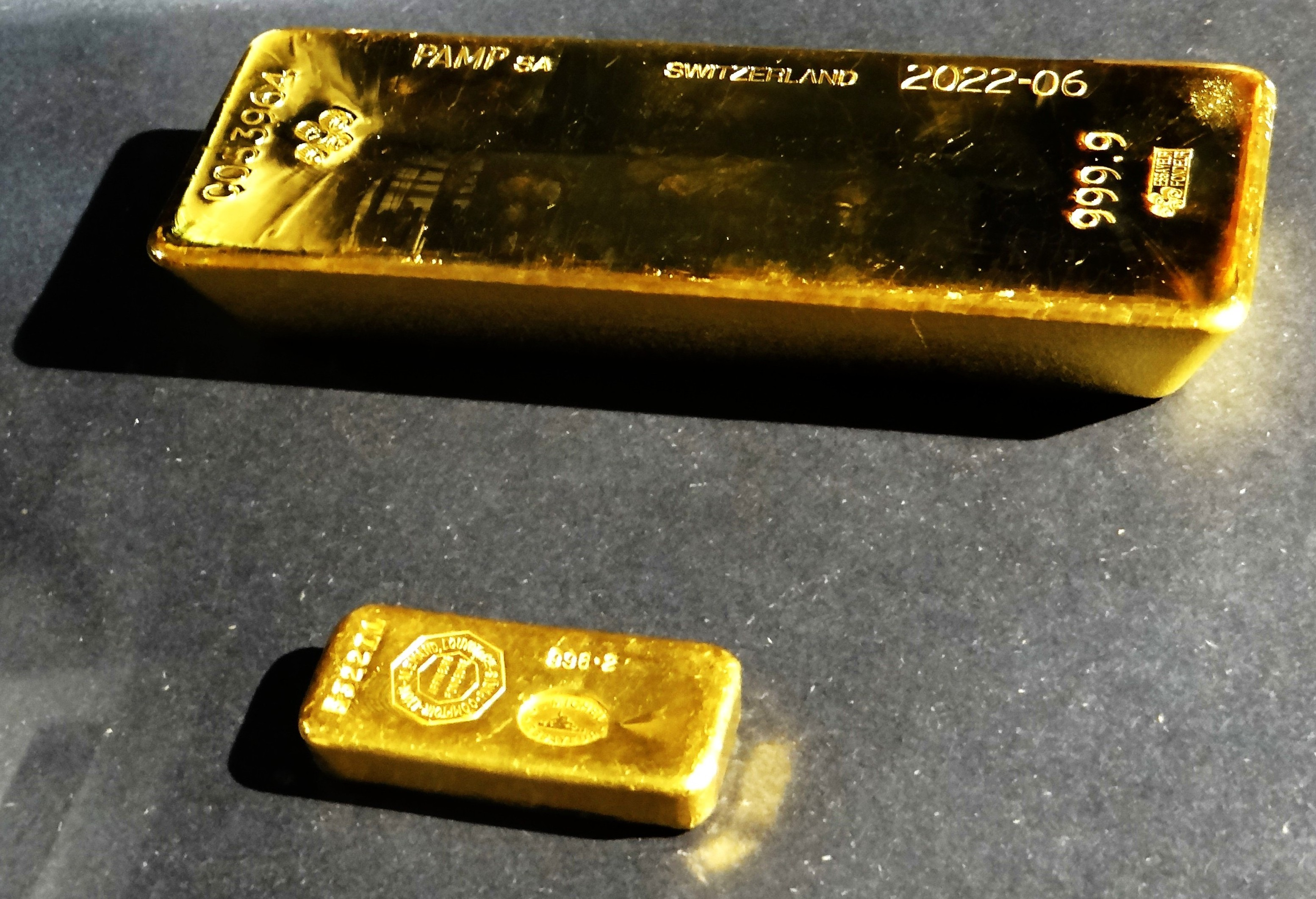
Gold ingot and bar on display at the Banque de France, Paris, European Heritage Days, September 2022

In the 19th century, monetary standards came to the foreground of policy issues. The bimetallic debate over whether silver as well as gold should back currency had distributional effects.

Britain adopted the gold standard in 1816, with a gradual transition of more countries that culminated in the classical gold standard era of 1870–1914. The gold standard tightly constrained economic policy discretion, with gold flows creating pressure on prices and wages that were automatic in theory. This system provided exchange rate stability but limited the ability to fight recessions.

=== The Keynesian era ===
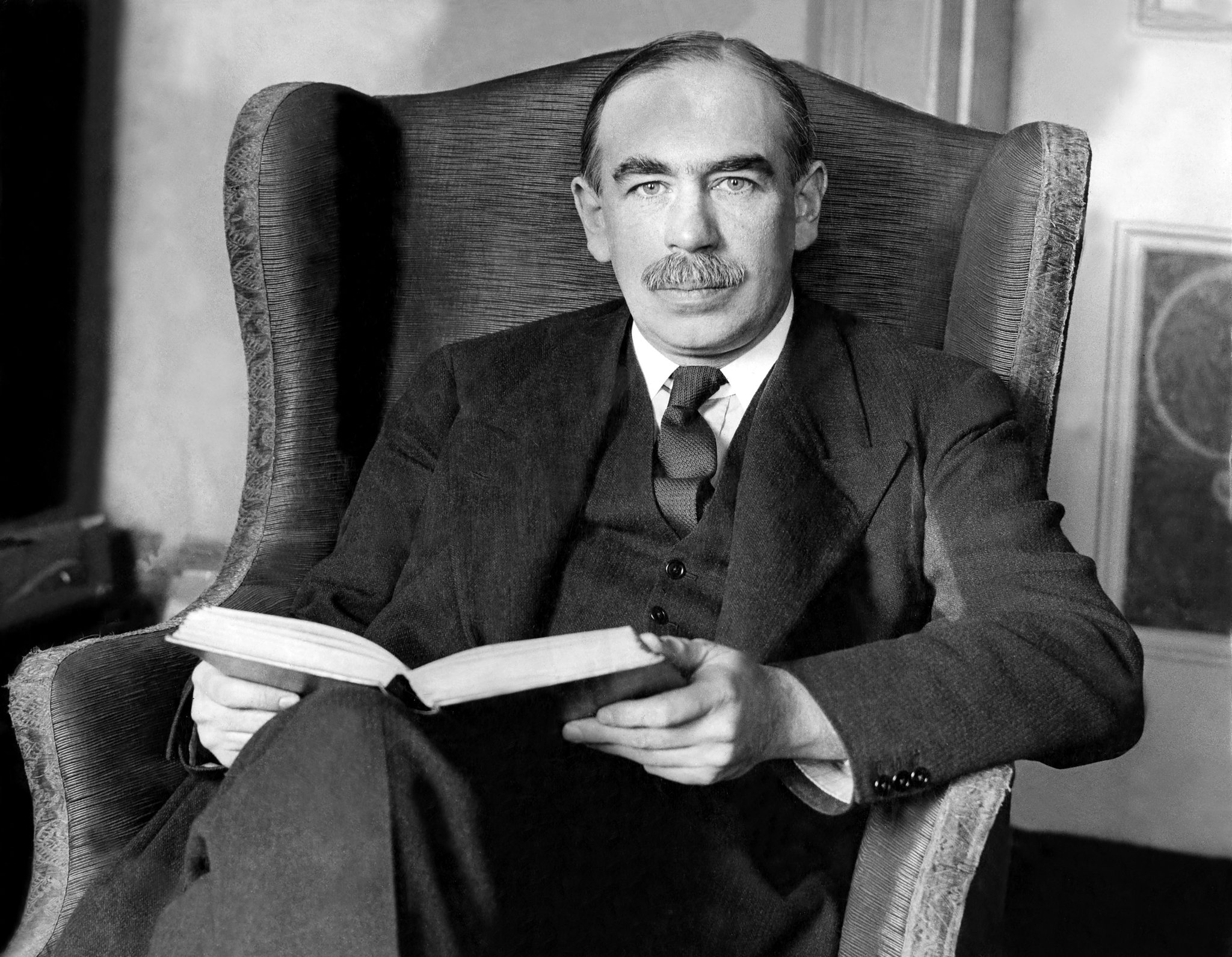
Portrait of John Maynard Keynes sitting down while holding a book

The Great Depression and World War II reshaped economic policymaking. The Great Depression thoroughly undermined the perspective that automatic market adjustments would quickly solve recessions, and showed deflation can be ruinous for the economy. John Maynard Keynes's The General Theory of Employment, Interest and Money (1936) provided theoretical justification for active fiscal policy, with governments taking action to create full employment.

In the postwar period, Keynesian demand management became the dominant policy paradigm. The Bretton Woods system (1944–1971) managed exchange rates, with currencies fixed in value to the US dollar, itself convertible to gold at a fixed price.

=== Stagflation and monetarism ===
The stagflation of the 1970s saw both unemployment and inflation rise, confounding Keynesian economists and prompting a rethinking of economic policy. In the monetarist school, Milton Friedman argued that the unemployment-inflation trade-off of the Phillips curve does not hold and that government intervention could lead to economic destabilization.

Many central banks prioritize inflation control over employment targets. Central bank independence and explicit inflation targets became widespread from the 1990s onward.

=== The 2008 financial crisis and renewed interventionism ===
The 2008 financial crisis and Great Recession prompted another shift in economic policymaking. Confronted with a severe economic crisis, governments worldwide responded with massive stimulus, bailouts, Zero interest-rate policy, and quantitative easing. Such responses rediscovered Keynesian intervention and prompted regulatory reform.

Subsequent debates included the pace of fiscal consolidation, quantitative easing's distributional consequences, and the risks when interest rates approach the lower bound. The COVID-19 pandemic of 2020 prompted a gargantuan fiscal response, with income transfers, wage subsidies, and a massive rise in public debt.

== Evidence-based policy ==
Evidence-based policy assesses whether causal hypotheses are supported by the best available evidence, rather than theory-based orthodoxy in current economics. The 2019 Nobel Prize in Economics was awarded to Abhijit Banerjee, Esther Duflo, and Michael Kremer for their use of field experiments to study the effectiveness of interventions. Carefully designed experiments such as randomized controlled trials can bring increased rigor to poverty alleviation.

However, the emphasis put on experimental evidence by the movement of evidence-based policy (and evidence-based medicine) results from the narrowly construed notion of intervention, which encompasses only policy decisions concerned with policymaking aimed at modifying causes to influence effects. In contrast to this idealized view of evidence-based policy movement, economic policymaking is a broader term that includes also institutional reforms and actions that do not require causal claims to be neutral under interventions. Such policy decisions can be grounded in, respectively, mechanistic evidence and correlational (econometric) studies.

== International dimensions ==
=== International institutions ===
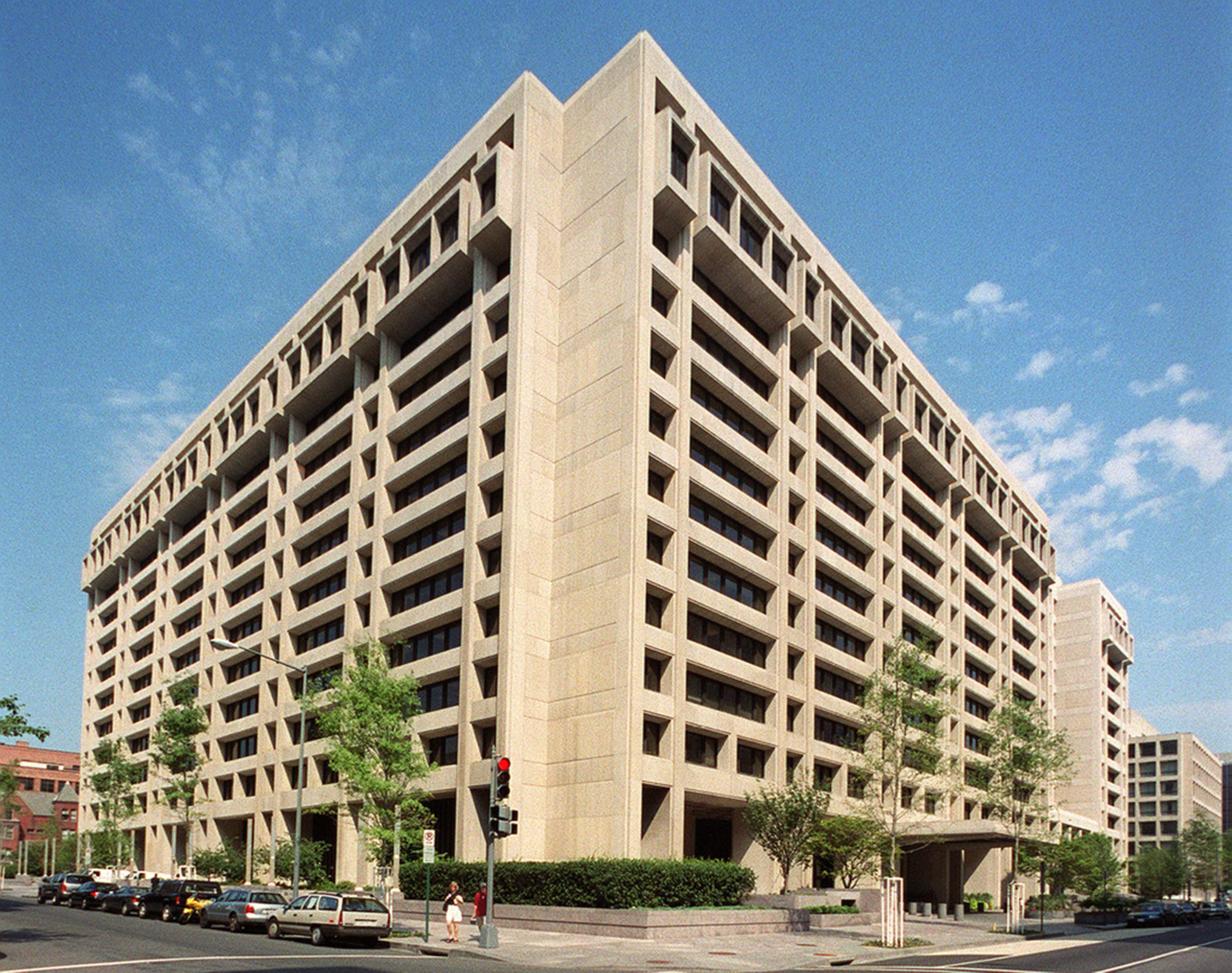
IMF Headquarters, Washington, DC.

The International Monetary Fund and World Bank were established at the 1944 Bretton Woods conference to assist in reconstruction after World War II. The IMF provides short-term lending to countries with balance of payments difficulties, typically with conditionality requiring currency devaluation and restrictions on government expenditure and the money supply. Critics argue that austerity translates into enormous suffering for millions, while proponents argue conditionalities are designed to stabilize economies.

The World Trade Organization provides a rules-based multilateral framework for trade policy, discouraging arbitrary tariff increases and addressing broader issues including technical standards, subsidies, and state-owned enterprises. The European Union's Stability and Growth Pact constrains national budgetary deficits and centralizes monetary power.

=== Policy spillovers and coordination ===
Economic policy can create strong spillovers for other countries. A devaluation shifts demand from foreign goods, incentivizing competitive devaluations. Conversely, expansionary fiscal policy increases imports and affects trading partners. Spillovers show the need for international policy coordination, though sustaining it is difficult in practice.

== See also ==
- Fiscal policy
- Budget process
- Constitutional economics
- Energy policy
- Job guarantee
- Social policy
- Stabilization policy
