= List of countries by spending on education as percentage of GDP =

This list shows the government spending on education of various countries and subnational areas by percentage of GDP. It does not include private expenditure on education.

== List ==
Education spending of countries and subnational areas by % of GDP
Country	% of GDP	Year
Kiribati	16.4	2023
Tuvalu	12.85	2023
Vanuatu	10.64	2023
Micronesia	10.54	2020
Cuba	9.39	2021
Namibia	9.04	2023
Solomon Islands	8.29	2023
Botswana	8.06	2020
Nauru	7.81	2022
Bolivia	7.58	2022
Sweden	7.57	2021
Marshall Islands	7.54	2022
Saint Vincent and the Grenadines	7.21	2022
Iceland	7.14	2022
Kyrgyzstan	6.83	2023
Sierra Leone	6.79	2023
Tunisia	6.73	2023
Lesotho	6.69	2023
Finland	6.54	2021
Israel	6.46	2022
Belgium	6.36	2021
Eswatini	6.31	2023
Moldova	6.25	2023
Costa Rica	6.25	2021
Macau	6.19	2022
Mozambique	6.16	2022
South Africa	6.15	2023
Samoa	6.11	2023
Morocco	6.02	2023
Senegal	5.99	2022
Ukraine	5.93	2022
Bhutan	5.85	2023
Tajikistan	5.81	2023
Jamaica	5.65	2023
Algeria	5.61	2023
Brazil	5.50	2021
Uzbekistan	5.47	2023
State of Palestine	5.43	2021
France	5.43	2021
United States	5.43	2021
Slovenia	5.37	2021
Malta	5.36	2021
Denmark	5.30	2022
Burkina Faso	5.28	2022
Estonia	5.26	2021
Cyprus	5.24	2021
New Zealand	5.23	2022
Australia	5.21	2022
Maldives	5.17	2023
Sao Tome and Principe	5.16	2022
Tonga	5.15	2023
Saudi Arabia	5.11	2023
Netherlands	5.05	2022
Kuwait	5.03	2023
Chile	5.00	2021
United Kingdom	4.96	2022
Belarus	4.95	2023
Rwanda	4.92	2023
Switzerland	4.89	2022
South Korea	4.87	2021
Burundi	4.82	2022
Argentina	4.81	2022
Czech Republic	4.3	2022
Slovakia	4.80	2021
Portugal	4.78	2021
Austria	4.77	2022
Seychelles	4.74	2022
Bulgaria	4.73	2021
Luxembourg	4.70	2022
Hungary	4.68	2021
Poland	4.67	2021
Cape Verde	4.67	2022
Dominica	4.66	2023
Latvia	4.62	2021
Mauritius	4.57	2023
Germany	4.54	2022
Uruguay	4.51	2022
Kazakhstan	4.46	2022
Spain	4.32	2022
Belize	4.26	2023
Lithuania	4.25	2021
Mexico	4.25	2021
Fiji	4.25	2023
Peru	4.24	2023
Italy	4.22	2021
Oman	4.20	2022
Sint Maarten	4.18	2022
Canada	4.14	2022
Bosnia and Herzegovina	4.14	2022
India	4.12	2022
Niger	4.10	2022
Greece	4.08	2021
Croatia	4.06	2021
Russia	4.05	2022
Honduras	4.05	2023
Barbados	4.04	2023
Mali	4.04	2022
China	4.02	2022
Norway	3.97	2022
Kenya	3.96	2023
Dominican Republic	3.94	2022
Grenada	3.94	2022
United Arab Emirates	3.89	2021
Ecuador	3.89	2023
Hong Kong	3.80	2023
Togo	3.80	2022
Nicaragua	3.79	2022
Mongolia	3.74	2023
Georgia	3.74	2023
Ethiopia	3.74	2022
Saint Lucia	3.70	2022
Nepal	3.68	2023
Antigua and Barbuda	3.65	2022
Saint Kitts and Nevis	3.63	2022
Malaysia	3.63	2023
Philippines	3.62	2023
Azerbaijan	3.58	2023
Zambia	3.58	2022
Palau	3.44	2023
San Marino	3.43	2022
Côte d'Ivoire	3.43	2023
Paraguay	3.41	2023
Benin	3.38	2022
Panama	3.37	2022
Romania	3.32	2021
Tanzania	3.26	2023
Serbia	3.24	2022
Japan	3.24	2022
Qatar	3.23	2020
Guatemala	3.18	2023
El Salvador	3.17	2023
Jordan	3.16	2022
Madagascar	3.14	2022
Turks and Caicos Islands	3.14	2023
Ireland	3.01	2021
Democratic Republic of the Congo	3.00	2022
Timor-Leste	2.97	2021
Congo	2.95	2022
Cambodia	2.95	2023
Iran	2.93	2023
Ghana	2.91	2022
Vietnam	2.89	2022
Trinidad and Tobago	2.88	2022
Suriname	2.87	2023
Bahamas	2.84	2022
Turkmenistan	2.75	2023
Albania	2.74	2022
Gambia	2.70	2023
Mauritania	2.65	2023
Cameroon	2.62	2022
Turkey	2.61	2022
Uganda	2.55	2023
Chad	2.54	2022
Thailand	2.52	2023
British Virgin Islands	2.48	2022
Comoros	2.43	2022
Angola	2.33	2022
Liberia	2.28	2022
Gabon	2.21	2022
Singapore	2.19	2023
Central African Republic	2.12	2022
Bahrain	1.99	2022
Guinea	1.99	2022
Bermuda	1.93	2023
Andorra	1.93	2023
Pakistan	1.87	2023
Sri Lanka	1.83	2023
Bangladesh	1.78	2023
Lebanon	1.67	2020
Cayman Islands	1.49	2022
Papua New Guinea	1.35	2021
Indonesia	1.28	2023
Haiti	1.27	2022
Laos	1.23	2023
Monaco	1.17	2022
Nigeria	0.35	2022
Armenia	0.24	2023

== Other ==
Education spending of countries and subnational areas by % of GDP
Location	% of GDP	Year	Source
American Samoa	14.7	2006	
Venezuela	6.9	2009	
Puerto Rico	6.1	2014	
Yemen	5.2	2012	
Syria	5.1	2009	
Curacao	5.1	2013	
Guyana	4.5	2018	
Colombia	4.5	2017	
Aruba	4.4	2019	
Brunei	4.4	2016	
Afghanistan	4.3	2017	
Egypt	3.9	2015	
Djibouti	3.8	2018	
Iraq	3.6	1989	
Malawi	3.3	2018	
North Macedonia	3.3	2002	
Liechtenstein	2.6	2011	
Libya	2.3	1999	
Eritrea	2.1	2012	
Zimbabwe	2.1	2018	
Sudan	2.0	2009	
Guinea-Bissau	2.0	2013	
Myanmar	2.0	2019	
South Sudan	1.6	2016	
Somalia	1.3	1973	
Equatorial Guinea	0.6	2003	

== See also ==
- Baumol effect – Rise of salaries in jobs that have seen little rise of productivity
- Education economics
- Free education
- List of countries by spending on education as percentage of government spending
- Lists of sovereign states and dependent territories
- Tuition payments
