= International rankings of the United Kingdom =

These are the international rankings of the United Kingdom.

== Indexes grouped by topic ==
Index	Rank	Countries reviewed
Economy
Human Development Index 2023	13 ▲2	192
Index of Economic Freedom 2023	28	167
Inequality adjusted Human Development Index 2023	13 ▼1	169
OECD Better Life Index 2020	14	40
Legatum Prosperity Index 2015	10	142
Index of Public Integrity 2016	6	105
Globalization Index 2015		207
Gallup gross median household income 2013	19	131
Median equivalent adult income 2009–2014	19	35
International Property Rights Index 2015	13	129
Logistics Performance Index 2014	4	160
Networked Readiness Index 2014	9	144
Household final consumption expenditure per capita 2016	8	221
Ease of doing business index 2017	7	185
World Economic Forum 2017	7	138
Number of billionaires 2016	7	74
Global Innovation Index 2026	6	139
Politics and liberties
V-Dem Democracy indices 2023	22	179
Democracy Index (The Economist) 2019	14	167
Freedom House ranking of political rights 2016	8	195
Freedom House ranking of civil liberties 2016		195
Fragile States Index (Reverse ranking) 2016	17	178
Press Freedom Index 2016	38	180
State of World Liberty Index 2020	12	187
World Index of Moral Freedom 2020	38	160
Corruption Perceptions Index 2015	10	175
Military
Global Peace Index 2017	41 ▲6	163
Merchant Navy	10	39
Healthcare
Total health expenditure per capita 2015	17	188
Euro health consumer index 2017	15	35
Other
Global Gender Gap Report 2015	20	144
World Happiness Report 2017	19 ▲4	157
Save the Children State of the World's Mothers report 2015	24	179
Wikipedia page edits 2013	4	155+

== Geographical rankings ==
Metric	Rank	Countries reviewed	Details
Total Area	78	233	242,495 km^{2} (93,628 sq mile) including land and water
Length of coastline	18	196	12,429 km.
List of countries by population (United Nations)	21	233	67,530,172
