= Final consumption expenditure =

In the national accounts expenditure on goods and services that are used for the direct satisfaction of individual needs (individual consumption) or collective needs of members of the community (collective consumption) is recorded in the use of income account under the transaction final consumption expenditure (FCE).

The most important part of final consumption expenditure is household final consumption expenditure. Government final consumption expenditure is made for collective consumption or for individual consumption in the form of social transfers in kind to households. Also non-profit institutions serving households provide individual consumption goods and services to households free of charge or at reduced prices.

== See also ==
List of countries by household final consumption expenditure per capita
