= List of largest consumer markets =

Below is a list of the largest consumer markets of the world, according to data from the World Bank. The countries or economic blocs are sorted by their household final consumption expenditure (HFCE), which represents consumer spending. Values are in nominal terms in U.S. dollars, then adjusted for purchasing power parity (PPP) in constant 2021 international dollars in nominal terms. A larger percentage of GDP cited below (especially larger than the entire economy, i.e., exceeding 100%) typically indicates the existence of an informal economy, at least in terms of income.

== List ==
Country	HFCE (millions of USD)		% of GDP	Year
Country	Nominal	2021 PPP	% of GDP	Year
World	60,347,337	88,594,034	58%	2023
United States	22,495,338	17,492,831	69%	2026
European Union	9,592,485	11,246,482	51%	2024
China	7,489,260	12,492,677	38%	2024
India	2,405,796	9,019,567	60%	2024
Japan	2,365,528	2,761,237	55%	2022
Germany	2,259,530	2,480,275	51%	2023
United Kingdom	2,064,938	1,960,294	62%	2023
France	1,628,357	1,660,567	62%	2023
Brazil	1,389,862	2,542,830	63%	2024
Italy	1,342,801	1,566,910	59%	2023
Mexico	1,302,382	1,828,035	69%	2024
Canada	1,181,871	1,172,725	56%	2023
Russia	1,073,210	2,938,894	53%	2024
Australia	897,961	790,078	50%	2024
Spain	879,143	1,118,776	58%	2023
South Korea	838,028	1,054,547	49%	2023
Turkey	786,594	1,824,831	58%	2024
Indonesia	773,553	2,042,153	53%	2024
Saudi Arabia	556,685	939,714	37%	2024
Poland	526,536	848,857	58%	2024
Netherlands	486,434	482,624	41%	2023
Switzerland	456,705	315,224	51%	2023
Argentina	431,270	716,218	62%	2024
Philippines	351,500	843,833	75%	2024
Egypt	340,743	1,544,873	85%	2024
Belgium	324,705	332,514	50%	2023
Pakistan	317,998	1,278,949	85%	2024
Bangladesh	315,690	965,487	69%	2024
Thailand	306,481	855,305	53%	2024
Colombia	306,122	633,333	75%	2024
Hong Kong	274,239	303,028	70%	2024
Austria	267,095	282,849	50%	2023
South Africa	259,561	533,101	60%	2024
Malaysia	256,509	707,414	60%	2024
Sweden	256,062	264,518	43%	2023
Israel	245,632	204,257	55%	2023
Romania	242,994	441,000	64%	2024
Vietnam	235,637	700,042	68%	2023
United Arab Emirates	234,510	311,254	39%	2023
Iran	220,580	696,205	48%	2024
Chile	191,906	301,434	63%	2024
Denmark	185,088	158,666	47%	2023
Norway	182,146	172,230	45%	2023
Portugal	179,660	240,363	64%	2023
Peru	178,072	296,875	65%	2024
Singapore	172,365	191,730	36%	2024
Greece	162,900	223,946	68%	2023
Finland	157,498	150,730	53%	2023
Czech Republic	150,986	180,200	47%	2023
Ireland	147,584	124,829	30%	2023
New Zealand	143,490	136,311	57%	2022
Kazakhstan	134,701	324,309	52%	2023
Ukraine	118,960	350,896	75%	2024
Iraq	115,265	231,993	63%	2024
Hungary	105,154	165,065	48%	2023
Algeria	101,009	291,999	44%	2023
Guatemala	99,589	191,968	85%	2024
Ethiopia	98,127	290,926	69%	2022
Puerto Rico	95,626	97,959	64%	2024
Morocco	94,677	200,258	58%	2024
Kenya	94,000	243,684	82%	2024
Dominican Republic	84,192	180,931	70%	2024
Ecuador	80,881	153,969	61%	2024
Slovakia	78,259	102,493	56%	2023
Uzbekistan	78,122	237,943	54%	2024
Ghana	69,626	177,544	69%	2024
Sri Lanka	67,994	190,910	69%	2024
Bulgaria	64,678	118,049	60%	2024
Costa Rica	60,948	78,692	63%	2024
Kuwait	59,789	91,787	45%	2022
Côte d'Ivoire	57,142	132,996	68%	2024
Serbia	55,895	93,846	68%	2024
Cuba	54,345	—	56%	2020
Croatia	52,723	81,746	58%	2024
Qatar	45,956	49,150	24%	2022
Lithuania	45,739	66,203	61%	2023
Angola	44,429	112,020	56%	2024
Democratic Republic of the Congo	44,361	83,367	71%	2024
Belarus	43,146	147,399	55%	2024
Tanzania	41,676	141,807	59%	2024
Azerbaijan	41,197	101,095	57%	2024
Tunisia	40,703	115,200	72%	2024
Zimbabwe	40,443	34,229	77%	2024
Sudan	40,272	66,954	72%	2024
Oman	40,069	72,382	39%	2023
Panama	38,892	68,250	50%	2023
Cameroon	38,232	102,227	72%	2024
Nepal	37,051	119,439	69%	2024
Jordan	36,507	75,325	85%	2021
Slovenia	36,181	46,962	52%	2023
Uganda	35,548	88,491	71%	2024
Honduras	31,898	56,105	80%	2024
Bolivia	30,913	81,797	68%	2023
Paraguay	29,776	68,477	66%	2024
El Salvador	28,158	49,881	83%	2024
Cambodia	27,709	67,651	69%	2024
Luxembourg	27,630	24,354	29%	2023
Lebanon	27,314	69,226	87%	2023
Syria	27,119	58,444	—	2022
Latvia	26,673	38,698	60%	2023
Haiti	25,179	29,384	102%	2024
Georgia	24,097	52,029	69%	2024
Estonia	21,582	24,779	49%	2023
Cyprus	21,393	27,486	65%	2024
Senegal	21,247	50,363	69%	2024
Bosnia and Herzegovina	19,558	36,781	76%	2024
Mali	19,112	54,319	73%	2024
Albania	18,909	28,918	80%	2024
Bahrain	17,954	31,428	40%	2023
Armenia	17,159	36,123	84%	2024
Guinea	17,082	38,565	68%	2024
Afghanistan	16,821	74,088	79%	2023
Nicaragua	15,882	36,802	72%	2024
Moldova	15,803	31,660	85%	2024
Iceland	15,508	11,777	51%	2023
Mozambique	15,469	35,631	69%	2024
Libya	15,255	29,003	—	2024
Somalia	15,014	33,539	—	2024
Macao	14,530	20,262	25%	2024
Burkina Faso	14,089	40,492	64%	2024
Kyrgyzstan	13,400	38,225	82%	2023
Palestine	13,097	19,530	90%	2024
Zambia	12,991	25,725	43%	2023
Benin	12,650	35,520	68%	2024
Chad	12,647	30,252	76%	2024
Madagascar	12,163	39,210	71%	2024
Mongolia	11,741	32,270	55%	2024
Niger	11,563	31,308	71%	2024
Malta	11,344	14,286	43%	2024
North Macedonia	11,331	25,574	65%	2024
Tajikistan	10,968	31,778	82%	2023
Namibia	10,598	25,342	73%	2024
Mauritius	10,262	20,639	75%	2024
Bahamas	10,180	7,876	69%	2024
Kosovo	9,395	18,918	84%	2024
Rwanda	9,243	34,508	73%	2024
Botswana	8,788	19,572	51%	2024
Togo	7,770	18,743	66%	2024
Congo	7,452	17,123	31%	2024
Gabon	7,023	12,823	39%	2024
Equatorial Guinea	6,755	13,261	58%	2024
Sierra Leone	6,612	23,583	99%	2024
Montenegro	6,155	11,180	72%	2024
Mauritania	5,893	15,755	57%	2023
French Polynesia	4,509	—	—	2023
Brunei	4,407	9,833	20%	2024
Guam	4,140	3,484	58%	2022
Bermuda	4,094	2,617	—	2024
Fiji	3,900	7,725	—	2023
Maldives	3,388	4,687	—	2023
US Virgin Islands	3,221	2,893	66%	2022
Djibouti	2,984	5,913	44%	2024
Eswatini	2,946	7,530	66%	2023
Central African Republic	2,604	5,643	86%	2024
Gambia	2,086	6,343	91%	2024
Cape Verde	2,068	3,417	62%	2024
Burundi	1,997	7,931	78%	2023
Lesotho	1,967	5,582	75%	2023
Belize	1,928	3,054	68%	2023
Aruba	1,900	2,110	61%	2023
Bhutan	1,794	5,698	60%	2023
Guinea-Bissau	1,632	4,039	100%	2024
Seychelles	1,616	2,301	64%	2024
Comoros	1,602	2,582	91%	2024
Faroe Islands	1,585	1,493	—	2023
East Timor	1,457	2,901	68%	2023
Greenland	1,084	1,299	36%	2023
Solomon Islands	966.84	1,074	—	2022
Samoa	862.64	1,087	—	2024
Vanuatu	795.40	694.38	—	2022
Northern Mariana Islands	726.00	739.50	47%	2022
San Marino	650.01	793.23	37%	2022
American Samoa	621.00	613.38	74%	2022
Tonga	547.64	630.48	—	2023
Kiribati	273.19	415.88	77%	2022
Palau	198.78	207.69	69%	2022
Marshall Islands	183.22	170.13	74%	2023

== See also ==
- List of countries by Human Development Index
- List of countries by GDP (nominal)
- List of countries by GDP (PPP)
- List of countries by GDP (nominal) per capita
- List of countries by GDP (PPP) per capita
- List of countries and dependencies by population
- List of sovereign states by percentage of population living in poverty

== Sources ==
- United Nations Statistics Division - National Accounts Main Aggregates Database
