= Household final consumption expenditure =

Part of a national account used on consumer spending

Household final consumption expenditure (HFCE) is a transaction of the national account's use of income account representing consumer spending. It consists of the expenditure incurred by resident households on individual consumption goods and services, including those sold at prices that are not economically significant. It also includes various kinds of imputed expenditure of which the imputed rent for services of owner-occupied housing (imputed rents) is generally the most important one. The household sector covers not only those living in traditional households, but also those people living in communal establishments, such as retirement homes, boarding houses and prisons.

The above given definition of HFCE includes expenditure by resident households on the domestic territory and expenditure by resident households abroad (outbound tourist), but excludes any non-resident households' expenditure on the domestic territory (inbound tourists). From this national definition of consumption expenditure may be distinguished the household final consumption expenditure according to the domestic concept which includes household expenditure made on the domestic territory by residents and inbound tourists, but excludes residents' expenditure made abroad.

HFCE is measured at purchasers' prices which is the price the purchaser actually pays at the time of the purchase. It includes non-deductible value added tax and other taxes on products, transport and marketing costs and tips paid over and above stated prices.

== Components ==
Household final consumption expenditure includes the following components:

- households' purchases of products for their everyday needs (e.g. food, clothing, cars, rents, personal services)
- households' partial payments for products provided by the general government (e.g. tickets to public museums and swimming pools)
- households' payments to the general government for licences and permits (e.g. fees for issuing passports)
- imputed rents for services of owner-occupied housing
- household's own account consumption of outputs produced by unincorporated enterprises owned by households (e.g. own-consumption of milk produced on a farm)
- income in kind earned by employees (free or reduced train tickets for railway employees)
- households' consumption of Financial Intermediation Services Indirectly Measured (FISIM)

== From household final consumption expenditure to actual final consumption of households ==
Household final consumption expenditure (HFCE) is not an exhaustive measure of the goods and services consumed by households. The general government and non-profit institutions serving households (NPISH) often provide goods and services to households for their individual consumption free of charge or at reduced prices. Examples are health services provided by governments or reimbursed by a social security fund, education services, the part of service provided by public museums, concert halls, operas, swimming pools that is not financed by entrance fees, aid for social housing etc. By adding the general government's and NPISHs' individual consumption expenditure to household final consumption expenditure one receives the actual final consumption of households.

Actual final consumption of households excludes the general government's collective consumption expenditure which is expenditure on goods and services that cannot be uniquely attributed to households (e.g. expenditure on defence, safety and order, home affairs, environmental protection, national bodies such as parliament, governments etc.).

== Data ==
In the member states of the European Union the share of household final consumption expenditure (HFCE) in actual final consumption of households usually varies between 70% and 90%. The rest is goods and services consumed free of charge (or at reduced prices) transferred by governments and non-profit institutions serving households to households. A high government share in the provision of individual consumption goods and services is often found in countries known as welfare states. Countries with relatively large shares of such transfers in kind are Belgium, Denmark, France, Luxembourg, the Netherlands, Finland and Sweden, where HFCE represents less than 80% of actual final consumption of households for most years.

The above observations are based on data downloadable from Eurostat's website:

- Household final consumption expenditure per inhabitant in the EU Member States and Japan
- Actual individual consumption per inhabitant in European countries

== See also ==
- Consumer price index (CPI)
- Final consumption expenditure
- Government final consumption expenditure
- Inflation
- List of countries by household final consumption expenditure per capita
- List of largest consumer markets
- Personal consumption expenditures price index (PCEPI)
