= Fiscal dominance =

Aspect of monetary policy

Fiscal dominance is a macroeconomic condition in which government fiscal pressures (high public debt and deficits) effectively dictate or constrain a country’s monetary policy. In a fiscally dominant regime, the central bank’s usual objective of controlling inflation becomes secondary to the Treasury’s budget financing needs, often leading the central bank to accommodate government borrowing by keeping interest rates low or buying government debt. This situation tends to create inflationary pressure – countries under fiscal dominance commonly experience higher inflation, and in extreme cases hyperinflation. Fiscal dominance is contrasted with monetary dominance, where the central bank can focus on price stability and the government adjusts its spending or raises taxes to ensure debt remains sustainable. The concept of fiscal dominance gained renewed attention in the 2020s amid unprecedented pandemic-related fiscal expansions and rising public debt levels, which have raised concerns in several economies.

As discussed below under Examples, the term "fiscal dominance" may also be used when regulatory policy is compromised due to fiscal considerations.

== Definition ==
Fiscal dominance describes an economic scenario where fiscal policy (“the power of the purse”) holds sway over monetary policy (“the power of the printing press”). In such a scenario, large government deficits and debts effectively set the terms for central bank action. The central bank may feel compelled to finance the government’s deficit by creating money or suppressing interest rates, rather than strictly aiming to control inflation. Economists have formalized this contrast in policy regimes: under monetary dominance, the central bank actively adjusts interest rates to keep inflation low, and the government in turn maintains discipline (e.g. by increasing future budget surpluses) so that public debt doesn’t become unmanageable. Under fiscal dominance, by contrast, the government sets its spending and borrowing without sufficient regard to the debt level, and the central bank is forced to passively accommodate these fiscal needs (for example, by ensuring debt servicing costs stay feasible). In other words, fiscal policy “drives” the economy’s inflation outcome, while monetary policy is relegated to keeping the government solvent.

This dynamic was famously described by economists Thomas Sargent and Neil Wallace, who noted that if fiscal pressures are high enough, they can force the monetary authority to generate revenue by printing money (seigniorage), at the expense of the central bank’s inflation target. A central bank in a fiscally dominant environment might postpone interest rate hikes or directly purchase government bonds to help finance the deficit. One analyst of the Cato Institute described fiscal dominance as a regime where “monetary policy serves fiscal ends,” meaning the central bank’s decisions are geared toward helping the government fund itself, thereby threatening central bank independence. Central bankers and economists view fiscal dominance as a threat to monetary policy credibility: if investors and the public believe the central bank is not free to fight inflation due to government financing needs, inflation expectations can rise. A key implication is upward pressure on prices – sustained fiscal dominance has a track record of causing high inflation, and in severe cases runaway inflation or hyperinflation, as the central bank’s anti-inflation mandate is compromised.

Fiscal dominance leads to inflation primarily through two channels. First, debt monetization and money supply growth occur when a government runs persistent deficits and the central bank accommodates this by purchasing government bonds (effectively printing money), which increases the money supply. More money in circulation, without a corresponding increase in goods and services, leads to inflation. If the public starts expecting that future deficits will also be financed by money creation, inflation expectations rise, causing further price increases. Second, debt-financed spending and demand pressures occur even if the central bank does not directly print money, as a government running large deficits stimulates demand in the economy. If the economy is already at full capacity, this extra demand results in rising prices rather than increased output.

High interest rates can themselves contribute to inflation under fiscal dominance. The reasoning is that interest payments on government debt act as stimulus because when a government has a high level of debt, raising interest rates significantly increases the amount it must pay to bondholders. These interest payments go to banks, pension funds, and investors, who then spend or reinvest this money in the economy, leading to greater demand. If the fiscal deficit remains high, the central bank’s attempt to cool inflation by raising rates paradoxically injects more spending power into the economy, sustaining inflationary pressures. This effect is particularly strong when a government is heavily indebted and must issue new debt to cover rising interest costs, and when the recipients of interest income (e.g., pensioners, funds) actively spend their earnings, rather than saving them.

== Examples ==
The COVID-19 pandemic saw the United States undertake exceptionally large fiscal stimulus alongside accommodating monetary policy, a combination often cited as a case of incipient fiscal dominance in a developed economy. Between 2020 and 2021, the U.S. Congress approved roughly $5–6 trillion in emergency spending measures, pushing the federal budget deficit to about 15% of GDP in 2020 (levels not seen since World War II). The Federal Reserve simultaneously kept interest rates near zero and expanded the money supply drastically. This policy mix of record fiscal deficits financed by debt (and effectively by central bank asset purchases) coincided with the fastest surge in U.S. inflation in four decades, as consumer price inflation peaked in 2022 at multi-decade highs. The Fed eventually responded by raising interest rates aggressively in 2022–2023 to tame inflation. Some analysts warn that given the U.S.’s debt trajectory, future fiscal dominance episodes remain a risk if political pressures discourage the Fed from raising rates sufficiently, or if fiscal policy again overwhelms monetary efforts.

Many emerging market economies, especially those with a history of fiscal profligacy and less independent central banks, have encountered full-blown fiscal dominance, often with dire consequences for inflation and currency stability. A prominent example is Argentina, which is frequently cited as a textbook case of fiscal dominance in modern times. Argentina’s government has persistently run large budget deficits and financed them by printing money, a policy pattern that has produced chronically high inflation and eroded confidence in the currency. Over the long term, Argentina’s inflation rate averaged about 190% per year between 1944 and 2023 – a staggering figure – while the country repeatedly resorted to monetizing its debt and defaulted on its obligations multiple times.

Other emerging economies with fragile fiscal and monetary frameworks have faced similar predicaments. In countries like Zimbabwe and Venezuela, for instance, government insistence on financing large deficits by money creation eventually led to hyperinflation and currency collapse – an extreme outcome of prolonged fiscal dominance.

As an example of where "fiscal dominance" can be used in the context of financial regulation, consider margin, capital or stablecoin regulation. In each of these contexts, lawmakers specify the relative desirability of sovereign debt and other assets (e.g., as collateral in the case of margin or stablecoin regulation, or for risk-weighting purposes in the case of capital regulations). These specifications may be distorted if the lawmaker compromises financial stability for fiscal considerations.
