= List of countries by spending on education as percentage of government spending =

This list shows the spending on education of various countries as a percentage of total government spending. It is based on data from the UNESCO Institute for Statistics. The UNESCO dataset does not specify whether education capital expenditures are included, or whether only recurrent expenditures were considered.

== List ==
Country	Expenditure on education (% of government spending)	Year
Grenada	42.79	2016
Zimbabwe	30.01	2014
Ethiopia	27.10	2015
Eswatini	24.95	2014
Bhutan	24.04	2017
Guatemala	23.09	2017
Tunisia	22.90	2015
Micronesia	22.31	2015
Honduras	22.02	2017
Saint Lucia	21.98	2016
Belize	21.68	2017
Senegal	21.56	2017
Chile	21.16	2016
Malaysia	21.06	2017
Turkmenistan	20.80	2012
Indonesia	20.50	2015
Burundi	20.40	2017
Ghana	20.10	2017
Iran	20.04	2017
Singapore	19.96	2013
Uzbekistan	19.96	2017
Mauritius	19.93	2017
Sierra Leone	19.92	2017
Thailand	19.13	2013
Mexico	19.02	2015
Saint Vincent and the Grenadines	18.98	2017
Mozambique	18.98	2013
Madagascar	18.97	2014
Benin	18.79	2016
South Africa	18.73	2017
Kyrgyzstan	18.64	2017
Côte d'Ivoire	18.62	2017
Viet Nam	18.52	2013
Jamaica	18.40	2017
Sao Tome and Principe	18.40	2017
Republic of Moldova	18.33	2017
Guyana	18.28	2017
Peru	18.24	2017
Iceland	18.16	2015
Burkina Faso	18.03	2015
Hong Kong	17.84	2017
Kenya	17.58	2017
United Republic of Tanzania	17.30	2014
Bolivia	16.84	2014
New Zealand	16.57	2016
Tajikistan	16.44	2015
Cabo Verde	16.38	2017
Cyprus	16.28	2015
Brazil	16.25	2015
Guinea-Bissau	16.19	2013
Togo	15.99	2016
Nepal	15.75	2017
Norway	15.73	2015
Afghanistan	15.66	2017
El Salvador	15.63	2017
Switzerland	15.53	2016
Sweden	15.50	2015
Cameroon	15.47	2017
Oman	15.34	2017
Comoros	15.27	2015
Colombia	15.17	2017
Israel	15.04	2015
Sri Lanka	14.50	2017
Malawi	14.34	2017
Fiji	14.30	2013
Latvia	14.13	2015
Australia	14.08	2015
India	14.05	2013
United Kingdom	13.92	2016
Mali	13.90	2016
Czechia	13.88	2015
Pakistan	13.85	2017
Denmark	13.83	2014
Lesotho	13.80	2018
Albania	13.60	2016
United States of America	13.59	2014
Mongolia	13.49	2017
Argentina	13.38	2016
Guinea	13.38	2017
Niger	13.25	2017
Malta	13.15	2015
Haiti	13.13	2016
Ireland	13.03	2015
Estonia	12.97	2015
Georgia	12.95	2017
Barbados	12.88	2017
Turkey	12.84	2015
Ecuador	12.60	2015
Jordan	12.53	2017
Chad	12.46	2013
Finland	12.41	2015
Ukraine	12.35	2016
Lithuania	12.29	2015
Belarus	12.28	2017
Netherlands	12.25	2015
Lao People's Democratic Republic	12.19	2014
Belgium	12.17	2015
Uganda	12.01	2017
Vanuatu	11.78	2017
Seychelles	11.72	2016
Democratic Republic of the Congo	11.71	2017
Poland	11.58	2015
Bulgaria	11.44	2013
Brunei Darussalam	11.44	2016
Bangladesh	11.42	2016
Kazakhstan	11.42	2017
Maldives	11.29	2016
Gabon	11.23	2014
Slovenia	11.22	2015
Rwanda	11.08	2017
Germany	10.99	2015
Russian Federation	10.87	2015
Austria	10.69	2015
Dominica	10.52	2015
Samoa	10.48	2016
Gambia	10.36	2016
Slovakia	10.28	2015
Armenia	10.20	2016
Portugal	10.15	2015
Spain	9.77	2015
France	9.62	2015
Croatia	9.49	2013
Luxembourg	9.43	2015
Myanmar	9.41	2018
Mauritania	9.33	2016
Hungary	9.14	2015
Japan	9.13	2016
Romania	9.08	2015
Qatar	8.88	2017
Cambodia	8.79	2014
Serbia	8.69	2016
Saint Kitts and Nevis	8.64	2015
Lebanon	8.58	2013
Azerbaijan	8.20	2016
Italy	8.11	2015
Congo	7.95	2015
Namibia	7.64	2014
Bahrain	7.18	2017
Liberia	7.06	2017
Timor-Leste	6.77	2014
South Sudan	1.07	2017

== See also ==
- List of countries by spending on education as percentage of GDP
