= Fiscal Observatory of Latin America and the Caribbean =

The Fiscal Observatory of Latin America and the Caribbean (OFILAC) is an initiative of the United Nations Economic Commission for Latin America and the Caribbean, especially by the Division for Economic Development, to contribute to improving fiscal policy through the dissemination of studies and debate. Financial support is provided by the Spanish Agency for International Cooperation and Development (AECID). Other partners of the Fiscal Observatory of Latin America and the Caribbean are: GIZ, AECID, European Commission, IMF, IADB, OECD, CIAT, and others. OFILAC provides a platform for the analysis, discussion and follow-up of fiscal policy in Latin America and supports debating of fiscal subjects among fiscal authorities, international organizations and other experts in the subject.
