= Inside lag =

In economics, the inside lag (or inside recognition and decision lag) is the amount of time it takes for a government or a central bank to respond to a shock in the economy. It is the delay in implementation of a fiscal policy or monetary policy. Its converse is the outside lag (the amount of time before an action by a government or a central bank affects an economy). The inside lag comprises the recognition lag (the time taken to recognize the shock) and the decision lag (the time taken to decide on and pursue a response).

The inside lag is generally a more severe problem for fiscal policy (government spending and taxation policy) than for monetary policy. Monetary policy is conducted by a central bank that is devoted substantially to monitoring and responding to economic shocks, whereas fiscal policy is conducted by a law-making body that has many other issues to confront as well as a highly deliberative process with which to confront them. Nevertheless, a central bank may often experience a substantial recognition lag prior to its becoming clear just what the latest economic figures imply for policy needs. Indeed, even after a central bank implements a policy response, its critics may still argue that it recognized the situation incorrectly.
