= Policy mix =

Combination of a country's monetary and fiscal policy

The policy mix is the combination of a country's monetary policy and fiscal policy. These two channels influence features such as economic growth and employment, and are generally determined by the central bank and the government (e.g., the United States Congress) respectively.

It is generally posited the policy mix should aim at maximizing growth and minimizing unemployment and inflation. However, according to theories advocating for 'central bank independence' central banks and governments are sometimes theorized to have different time horizons, with the elected governments having a shorter horizon. Both can have other objectives and must adhere to some constraints – obeying a deficit rule, securing the financial sector, courting popularity, etc. – diverting them from these primary objectives.

Monetary policy is typically carried out by the central bank, which controls interest rates and the money supply to balance the outcomes for inflation and unemployment. The government influences labour market conditions, public investment, public spending, and discretionary fiscal policy.

Central bank independence is generally held to be positive, because it prevents a single authority from simultaneously issuing debt and paying it off with newly created money, which would be inflationary.

== See also ==
- Energy mix
- Stimulus (economics)
