= List of countries by household final consumption expenditure per capita =

Household final consumption expenditure is the market value of all goods and services purchased by households in a given year—excluding purchases of dwellings but including imputed rent for owner-occupied housing—divided by the country's mid-year population. It covers durable goods (such as cars, washing machines, and computers), payments to governments for permits and licenses, and the expenditures of nonprofit institutions serving households, even when these are reported separately.

Because it reflects only direct household expenditure (plus imputations such as owner-occupied rent), the measure excludes the value of goods and services provided free of charge by governments, such as public education and healthcare. Consequently, it may understate actual consumption in countries with extensive public services.

As of 2024, the United States has the highest household final consumption expenditure per capita in the world, when expressed in constant 2021 dollars adjusted for purchasing power parity.

== List ==
The latest available figures for each country and territory are shown.

Country or territory	Household expenditure per capita (constant PPP 2021 Intl. $)	Year
United States	51,433	2024
Bermuda	40,493	2024
Hong Kong	40,274	2024
Luxembourg	36,544	2023
Switzerland	35,466	2023
Singapore	31,760	2024
Norway	31,203	2023
Austria	30,974	2023
Puerto Rico	30,576	2023
Iceland	29,940	2023
United Arab Emirates	29,689	2023
Germany	29,562	2023
Macau	29,494	2024
Canada	29,257	2023
Cyprus	29,242	2024
Australia	29,042	2024
United Kingdom	28,621	2023
Faroe Islands	28,015	2021
Belgium	27,513	2023
United States Virgin Islands	27,441	2022
Netherlands	26,997	2023
Finland	26,994	2023
Denmark	26,680	2023
New Zealand	26,638	2022
Saudi Arabia	26,621	2024
Italy	26,561	2023
Sweden	25,105	2023
European Union	25,024	2023
France	25,014	2023
Malta	24,873	2024
Ireland	23,519	2023
San Marino	23,500	2022
Poland	23,222	2024
Spain	23,140	2023
Romania	23,126	2024
Lithuania	23,054	2023
Greenland	22,852	2023
Portugal	22,723	2023
Slovenia	22,147	2023
Japan	22,068	2022
Greece	21,522	2023
Turkey	21,338	2024
Brunei	21,250	2024
Croatia	21,143	2024
Guam	21,095	2022
Israel	20,739	2023
Latvia	20,612	2023
South Korea	20,392	2023
Russia	20,129	2024
Kuwait	19,999	2022
Malaysia	19,895	2024
Bahrain	19,814	2023
The Bahamas	19,626	2024
Qatar	19,621	2021
Aruba	19,597	2021
Seychelles	18,964	2024
Slovakia	18,887	2023
Bulgaria	18,318	2024
Estonia	18,083	2023
Montenegro	17,922	2024
Hungary	17,208	2023
Czech Republic	16,587	2023
Mauritius	16,387	2024
Belarus	16,138	2024
Northern Mariana Islands	16,049	2022
Kazakhstan	15,989	2023
Dominican Republic	15,833	2024
Argentina	15,673	2024
Costa Rica	15,340	2024
Panama	15,307	2023
Chile	15,251	2024
Oman	14,335	2023
North Macedonia	14,270	2024
Serbia	14,247	2024
Georgia	14,162	2024
Mexico	13,969	2024
Egypt	13,256	2024
Moldova	13,251	2024
American Samoa	12,688	2022
Kosovo	12,387	2024
Brazil	11,995	2024
Lebanon	11,990	2023
Colombia	11,975	2024
Thailand	11,934	2024
Armenia	11,908	2024
Palau	11,716	2023
Bosnia and Herzegovina	11,624	2024
World	10,985	2023
Albania	10,653	2024
Guatemala	10,429	2024
Azerbaijan	9,972	2021
Ukraine	9,915	2024
Paraguay	9,883	2024
Tunisia	9,383	2024
Mongolia	9,155	2024
Maldives	8,911	2023
China	8,856	2023
Sri Lanka	8,711	2024
Peru	8,676	2024
Ecuador	8,490	2024
Fiji	8,427	2021
Namibia	8,363	2024
South Africa	8,329	2024
El Salvador	7,870	2024
Botswana	7,763	2024
Iran	7,603	2024
Belize	7,429	2023
Philippines	7,284	2024
Bhutan	7,246	2023
Indonesia	7,204	2024
Equatorial Guinea	7,007	2024
Vietnam	6,976	2023
Jordan	6,807	2021
Bolivia	6,680	2023
Uzbekistan	6,544	2024
Cape Verde	6,510	2024
Algeria	6,325	2023
India	6,216	2024
Eswatini	6,119	2023
Tonga	6,028	2023
Bangladesh	5,563	2024
Kyrgyzstan	5,384	2023
Nicaragua	5,321	2024
Honduras	5,183	2024
Morocco	5,178	2024
Ghana	5,157	2024
Pakistan	5,090	2024
Djibouti	5,059	2024
Gabon	5,050	2024
Iraq	5,039	2024
Samoa	4,987	2024
Marshall Islands	4,382	2023
Kenya	4,318	2024
Ivory Coast	4,165	2024
Nepal	4,028	2024
Libya	3,929	2024
Cambodia	3,835	2024
Palestine	3,692	2024
Cameroon	3,510	2024
Kiribati	3,188	2022
Mauritania	3,137	2023
Tajikistan	3,059	2023
Comoros	2,979	2024
Angola	2,957	2024
Sierra Leone	2,729	2024
Senegal	2,722	2024
Republic of the Congo	2,704	2024
Guinea	2,614	2024
Syria	2,602	2022
Haiti	2,496	2024
Benin	2,456	2024
Rwanda	2,421	2024
Lesotho	2,415	2023
The Gambia	2,298	2024
Mali	2,219	2024
Vanuatu	2,218	2022
Ethiopia	2,203	2024
Tanzania	2,134	2024
Timor-Leste	2,096	2023
Zimbabwe	2,058	2024
Togo	1,970	2024
Guinea-Bissau	1,835	2024
Afghanistan	1,787	2023
Uganda	1,769	2024
Somalia	1,764	2024
Burkina Faso	1,719	2024
Chad	1,490	2024
Solomon Islands	1,375	2022
Sudan	1,327	2024
Zambia	1,312	2021
Madagascar	1,227	2024
Niger	1,158	2024
Central African Republic	1,059	2024
Mozambique	1,029	2024
Democratic Republic of the Congo	763	2024
Burundi	579	2023

== See also ==
- List of countries by average wage
- Disposable household and per capita income
- Gross domestic product
- Income distribution
- List of countries by GDP (nominal) per capita
- List of countries by GNI (nominal) per capita
- Median income
