= Discretionary policy =

Economic policy based on ad-hoc judgements of policymakers

In macroeconomics, discretionary policy is an economic policy based on the ad hoc judgment of policymakers as opposed to policy set by predetermined rules. For instance, a central banker could make decisions on interest rates on a case-by-case basis instead of allowing a set rule, such as Friedman's k-percent rule, an inflation target following the Taylor rule, or a nominal income target to determine interest rates or the money supply. In practice, most policy actions are discretionary in nature.

"Discretionary policy" can refer to decision making in both monetary policy and fiscal policy. The opposite is a commitment policy.

== Arguments against ==
Monetarist economists in particular have been opponents of the use of discretionary policy. According to Milton Friedman, the dynamics of change associated with the passage of time presents a timing problem for public policy. The reason this poses a problem is because a long and variable time lag exists between:

1. the need for action and the recognition of that need;
2. the recognition of a problem and the design and implementation of a policy response; and
3. the implementation of the policy and the effect of the policy.

It is because of these lags that Friedman argues that discretionary public policy will often be destabilizing. For this reason, he argued the case for general rules rather than discretionary policy.

Friedman formalized his argument in the context of monetary policy as follows. The quantity equation says that

$$MV=Y$$

where M is the money supply, V is the velocity of money, and Y is nominal GDP. Expressing this in growth rates gives

$$m+v=y,$$

where m, v, and y are the growth rates of the money supply, velocity and nominal GDP respectively. Suppose that the policymaker wishes for the variance of nominal GDP to be as low as possible—that is, it defines a stabilizing approach to monetary policy as one which decreases nominal GDP variance. From the last equation we have

$$\sigma_y^2=\sigma_m^2+\sigma_v^2+2\rho_{mv} \sigma_m \sigma_v,$$

where $\sigma$ refers to the standard deviation (square root of the variance) of the subscripted variable and $\rho$ refers to the correlation coefficient between the subscripted variables. With no use of discretionary policy or any rule giving fluctuations of the money supply, $\sigma_m$ will equal zero and the target variance $\sigma_y^2$ will simply be the exogenous variance of velocity, $\sigma_v^2.$ With the use of discretionary policy, on the other hand, all standard deviations in the above equation will be positive, and discretionary policy will have been stabilizing if and only if $\sigma_y^2<\sigma_v^2$—that is, if and only if

$$\rho_{mv} < \frac{-\sigma_m}{2\sigma_v}.$$

Thus the monetary authority would have to be sufficiently astute in its policy timing, in trying to counteract anticipated fluctuations in velocity, that the correlation of its money supply changes with velocity changes is not merely negative, but sufficiently negative to overcome the inherently GDP-variance-magnifying effects of money supply variation. Friedman believed that this condition for discretionary policy to be stabilizing is unlikely to be fulfilled in practice, because of the timing problems discussed above.

A related issue is the probable existence of multiplier uncertainty—imperfect knowledge of the overall ultimate effect of a policy action of a given size. Generally multiplier uncertainty calls for more caution and the use of quantitatively smaller policy actions.

== Arguments for ==
Proponents of the use of discretionary policy, including in particular Keynesians, argue that our understanding of the workings of the economy is sufficiently astute, and the accessibility of detailed real-time economic data to policymakers is sufficiently great, that in practice discretionary policy has been stabilizing. For example, it is widely believed that the extreme expansion of the monetary base by the U.S. Federal Reserve and other central banks prevented the Great Recession of the 2000s decade from becoming a full-blown depression.
