= Fiscal policy =

Use of government revenue collection and expenditure to influence a country's economy

In economics and political science, fiscal policy is the use of government revenue collection (taxes or tax cuts) and expenditure to influence a country's economy. The use of government revenue expenditures to influence macroeconomic variables developed in reaction to the Great Depression of the 1930s, when the previous laissez-faire approach to economic management became unworkable. Fiscal policy is based on the theories of the British economist John Maynard Keynes, whose Keynesian economics theorised that government changes in the levels of taxation and government spending influence aggregate demand and the level of economic activity. Fiscal and monetary policy are the key strategies used by a country's government and central bank to advance its economic objectives. The combination of these policies enables these authorities to target inflation and to increase employment. In modern economies, inflation is conventionally considered "healthy" in the range of 2%–3%. Additionally, it is designed to try to keep GDP growth at 2%–3% and the unemployment rate near the natural unemployment rate of 4%–5%. This implies that fiscal policy is used to stabilise the economy over the course of the business cycle.

Changes in the level and composition of taxation and government spending can affect macroeconomic variables, including:

- aggregate demand and the level of economic activity
- saving and investment
- income distribution
- allocation of resources.

Fiscal policy can be distinguished from monetary policy, in that fiscal policy deals with taxation and government spending and is often administered by a government department; while monetary policy deals with the money supply, interest rates and is often administered by a country's central bank. Both fiscal and monetary policies influence a country's economic performance.

== Monetary/fiscal debate ==
Since the 1970s, it became clear that monetary policy performance has some benefits over fiscal policy due to the fact that it reduces political influence, as it is set by the central bank (to have an expanding economy before the general election, politicians might cut the interest rates). Additionally, fiscal policy can potentially have more supply-side effects on the economy: to reduce inflation, the measures of increasing taxes and lowering spending would not be preferred, so the government might be reluctant to use these. Monetary policy is generally quicker to implement as interest rates can be set every month, while the decision to increase government spending might take time to figure out which area the money should be spent on.

The recession of the 2000s decade shows that monetary policy also has certain limitations. A liquidity trap occurs when interest rate cuts are insufficient as a demand booster as banks do not want to lend and the consumers are reluctant to increase spending due to negative expectations for the economy. Government spending is responsible for creating the demand in the economy and can provide a kick-start to get the economy out of the recession. When a deep recession takes place, it is not sufficient to rely just on monetary policy to restore the economic equilibrium. Each side of these two policies has its differences, therefore, combining aspects of both policies to deal with economic problems has become a solution that is now used by the US. These policies have limited effects; however, fiscal policy seems to have a greater effect over the long-run period, while monetary policy tends to have a short-run success.

In 2000, a survey of 298 members of the American Economic Association (AEA) found that while 84 percent generally agreed with the statement "Fiscal policy has a significant stimulative impact on a less than fully employed economy", 71 percent also generally agreed with the statement "Management of the business cycle should be left to the Federal Reserve; activist fiscal policy should be avoided." In 2011, a follow-up survey of 568 AEA members found that the previous consensus about the latter proposition had dissolved and was by then roughly evenly disputed.

== Stances ==
Depending on the state of the economy, fiscal policy may reach for different objectives: its focus can be to restrict economic growth by mediating inflation or, in turn, increase economic growth by decreasing taxes, encouraging spending on different projects that act as stimuli to economic growth and enabling borrowing and spending. The three stances of fiscal policy are the following:

- Neutral fiscal policy is usually undertaken when an economy is in neither a recession nor an expansion. The amount of government deficit spending (the excess not financed by tax revenue) is roughly the same as it has been on average over time, so no changes to it are occurring that would have an effect on the level of economic activity.
- Expansionary fiscal policy is used by the government when trying to balance the contraction phase in the business cycle. It involves government spending exceeding tax revenue by more than it has tended to, and is usually undertaken during recessions. Examples of expansionary fiscal policy measures include increased government spending on public works (e.g., building schools) and providing the residents of the economy with tax cuts to increase their purchasing power (in order to fix a decrease in the demand).
- Contractionary fiscal policy, on the other hand, is a measure to increase tax rates and decrease government spending. It occurs when government deficit spending is lower than usual. This has the potential to slow economic growth if inflation, which was caused by a significant increase in aggregate demand and the supply of money, is excessive. By reducing the economy's amount of aggregate income, the available amount for consumers to spend is also reduced. So, contractionary fiscal policy measures are employed when unsustainable growth takes place, leading to inflation, high prices of investment, recession and unemployment above the "healthy" level of 3%–4%.

However, these definitions can be misleading because, even with no changes in spending or tax laws at all, cyclic fluctuations of the economy cause cyclic fluctuations of tax revenues and of some types of government spending, altering the deficit situation; these are not considered to be policy changes. Therefore, for purposes of the above definitions, "government spending" and "tax revenue" are normally replaced by "cyclically adjusted government spending" and "cyclically adjusted tax revenue". Thus, for example, a government budget that is balanced over the course of the business cycle is considered to represent a neutral and effective fiscal policy stance.

== Methods of fiscal policy funding ==
Governments spend money on a wide variety of things, from the military and police to services such as education and health care, as well as transfer payments such as welfare benefits. This expenditure can be funded in a number of different ways:

- Taxation
- Seigniorage, the benefit from printing money
- Borrowing money from the population or from abroad
- Dipping into fiscal reserves
- Sale of fixed assets (e.g., land)
- Selling equity to the population

=== Borrowing ===
A fiscal deficit is often funded by issuing bonds such as Treasury bills or and gilt-edged securities but can also be funded by issuing equity. Bonds pay interest, either for a fixed period or indefinitely that is funded by taxpayers as a whole. Equity offers returns on investment (interest) that can only be realized in discharging a future tax liability by an individual taxpayer. If available government revenue is insufficient to support the interest payments on bonds, a nation may default on its debts, usually to foreign creditors. Public debt or borrowing refers to the government borrowing from the public. It is impossible for a government to "default" on its equity since the total returns available to all investors (taxpayers) are limited at any point by the total current year tax liability of all investors.

=== Dipping into prior surpluses ===
A fiscal surplus is often saved for future use, and may be invested in either local currency or any financial instrument that may be traded later once resources are needed and the additional debt is not needed.

== Balanced budget amendment ==
The concept of a balanced budget amendment or fiscal straitjacket is a general economic principle that suggests strict constraints on government spending and public sector borrowing, to limit or regulate the budget deficit over a time period. Most US states have balanced budget rules that prevent them from running a deficit. The United States federal government technically has a legal cap on the total amount of money it can borrow, but it is not a meaningful constraint because the cap can be raised as easily as spending can be authorized, and the cap is almost always raised before the debt gets that high. A balanced budget amendment can include an adjustment for business cycles.

== Fiscal policy in developing economies ==
The impact of fiscal policy is primarily talked about in the context of developed economies. However, fiscal policy is utilized differently in developing countries. Instead of maintaining economic growth, it is used to generate additional economic growth through improving human capital. This can be done by investment in public expenditures such as infrastructure and education. When done successfully, it can result in long-term economic gains. Nevertheless, developing countries must still consider the impact fiscal policy will have on inflation and unemployment. For some developing countries, implementing fiscal policy that improves economic stability involves "re-orientation" towards fiscal discipline and reducing government influence and intervention to give the country's private sector the ability to grow and stabilize.

One of the key issues developing economies are more likely to face is an inability to fund fiscal policy. The tax revenue collected by developed countries is almost twice that of developing countries in terms of percentage of GDP. In addition, there is a growing debt crisis in developing countries that has reached $11.4 trillion, fueled partly by development projects. This has led to governments prioritizing repaying debt over funding public essential services. Many developing countries have been left unable to continue implementing appropriate fiscal policy due to a lack of resources.

== Economic effects ==
Governments use fiscal policy to influence the level of aggregate demand in the economy, so that certain economic goals can be achieved:

- Price stability;
- Full employment;
- Economic growth.

The Keynesian view of economics suggests that increasing government spending and decreasing the rate of taxes are the best ways to have an influence on aggregate demand, stimulate it, while decreasing spending and increasing taxes after the economic expansion has already taken place. Additionally, Keynesians argue that expansionary fiscal policy should be used in times of recession or low economic activity as an essential tool for building the framework for strong economic growth and working towards full employment. In theory, the resulting deficits would be paid for by an expanded economy during the expansion that would follow; this was the reasoning behind the New Deal.

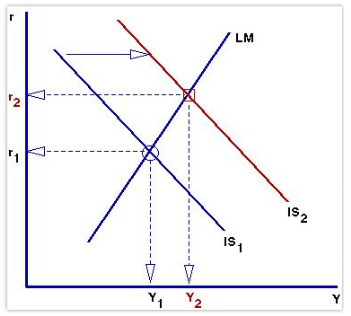
The IS curve shifts to the right, increasing real interest rates (r) and expansion in the "real" economy (real GDP, or Y).

The IS-LM model is another way of understanding the effects of fiscal expansion. As the government increases spending, there will be a shift in the IS curve up and to the right. In the short run, this increases the real interest rate, which then reduces private investment and increases aggregate demand, placing upward pressure on supply. To meet the short-run increase in aggregate demand, firms increase full-employment output. The increase in short-run price levels reduces the money supply, which shifts the LM curve back, and thus, returning the general equilibrium to the original full employment (FE) level. Therefore, the IS-LM model shows that there will be an overall increase in the price level and real interest rates in the long run due to fiscal expansion.

Governments can use a budget surplus to do two things:

- to slow the pace of strong economic growth;
- to stabilise prices when inflation is too high.

Keynesian theory posits that removing spending from the economy will reduce levels of aggregate demand and contract the economy, thus stabilizing prices. Another model commonly used to understand the impacts of fiscal policy is the Aggregate Demand - Aggregate Supply (AD-AS) model. It is similar to the IS-LM model but allows for the price level to vary, making it the superior model for a long-run analysis. Economists still debate the effectiveness of fiscal stimulus. The argument mostly centers on crowding out: whether government borrowing leads to higher interest rates that may offset the stimulative impact of spending. When the government runs a budget deficit, funds will need to come from public borrowing (the issue of government bonds), overseas borrowing, or monetizing the debt. When governments fund a deficit with the issuing of government bonds, interest rates can increase across the market, because government borrowing creates higher demand for credit in the financial markets. This decreases aggregate demand for goods and services, either partially or entirely offsetting the direct expansionary impact of the deficit spending, thus diminishing or eliminating the achievement of the objective of a fiscal stimulus. Neoclassical economists generally emphasize crowding out while Keynesians argue that fiscal policy can still be effective, especially in a liquidity trap where, they argue, crowding out is minimal.

In the classical view, expansionary fiscal policy also decreases net exports, which has a mitigating effect on national output and income. When government borrowing increases interest rates it attracts foreign capital from foreign investors. This is because, all other things being equal, the bonds issued from a country executing expansionary fiscal policy now offer a higher rate of return. In other words, companies wanting to finance projects must compete with their government for capital so they offer higher rates of return. To purchase bonds originating from a certain country, foreign investors must obtain that country's currency. Therefore, when foreign capital flows into the country undergoing fiscal expansion, demand for that country's currency increases. The increased demand, in turn, causes the currency to appreciate, reducing the cost of imports and making exports from that country more expensive to foreigners. Consequently, exports decrease and imports increase, reducing demand from net exports.

Some economists oppose the discretionary use of fiscal stimulus because of the inside lag (the time lag involved in implementing it), which is almost inevitably long because of the substantial legislative effort involved. Further, the outside lag between the time of implementation and the time that most of the effects of the stimulus are felt could mean that the stimulus hits an already-recovering economy and overheats the ensuing h rather than stimulating the economy when it needs it. Some economists are also concerned about potential inflationary effects driven by increased demand engendered by a fiscal stimulus. In theory, fiscal stimulus does not cause inflation when it uses resources that would have otherwise been idle. For instance, if a fiscal stimulus employs a worker who otherwise would have been unemployed, there is no inflationary effect; however, if the stimulus employs a worker who otherwise would have had a job, the stimulus is increasing labor demand while labor supply remains fixed, leading to wage inflation and therefore price inflation.

== See also ==
- Econometrics
- Fiscal Observatory of Latin America and the Caribbean
- Fiscal policy of the United States
- Fiscal dominance
- Fiscal gap
- Fiscal sustainability
- Fiscal union
- Functional finance
- Monetary policy
- National fiscal policy response to the late 2000s recession
- Policy mix
- Tax policy

== Bibliography ==
- Simonsen, M.H. The Econometrics and The State Brasilia University Editor, 1960–1964.
- Heyne, P. T., Boettke, P. J., Prychitko, D. L. (2002). The Economic Way of Thinking (10th ed). Prentice Hall.
- Larch, M. and J. Nogueira Martins (2009). Fiscal Policy Making in the European Union: An Assessment of Current Practice and Challenges. Routledge.
- Hansen, Bent (2003). The Economic Theory of Fiscal Policy, Volume 3. Routledge.
- Anderson, J. E. (2005). Fiscal Reform and its Firm-Level Effects in Eastern Europe and Central Asia, Working Papers Series wp800, William Davidson Institute at the University of Michigan.
- D. Harries. Roger Fenton and the Crimean War
- Schmidt, M (2018). "A Look at Fiscal and Monetary Policy", Dotdash
- Pettinger, T. (2017). "Difference between monetary and fiscal policy", EconomicsHelp.org
- Amadeo, K. (2018). "Fiscal Policy Types, Objectives, and Tools", Dotdash
- Kramer, L. (2019). "What Is Fiscal Policy?", Dotdash
- Macek, R; Janků, J. (2015) "The Impact of Fiscal Policy on Economic Growth Depending on Institutional Conditions"
