= Austerity: The History of a Dangerous Idea =

2013 book about the economic policy

- Author: Mark Blyth
- Language: English
- Genre: Nonfiction
- Publisher: Oxford University Press
- Publication date: 2013
- Publication place: United Kingdom
- Media type: Print (hard and paperback)
- Pages: 336
- ISBN: 9780199389445
- OCLC: 861725883

Austerity: The History of a Dangerous Idea is a 2013 book by Mark Blyth that explores the economic policy of austerity. Studying the use of austerity around the world up to the early 2010s and tracing its intellectual lineage, Blyth argues that the case for increasing economic growth through austerity is overstated, is counterproductive when implemented during recessions, and has exacerbated the European debt crisis. Austerity was selected among the Best Books of 2013 in reviews by the Financial Times and Bloomberg News.

== Background ==
Mark Blyth is the Eastman Professor of Political Economy and Professor of Political Science and International and Public Affairs at Brown University's Watson Institute for International and Public Affairs. He wrote Austerity in the aftermath of the Great Recession following the G20s' turn in mid-2010 away from Keynesian fiscal stimulus and towards fiscal consolidation and austerity.

== Synopsis ==
Blyth begins by reviewing the arguments in favour of austerity, namely an increase in business confidence and consequent investment due to less crowding out of private sector debt by government debt and a lower risk of default and the inefficiency of public spending due to small fiscal multipliers. While Blyth acknowledges that countries cannot solve the problem of high public debt through further borrowing, he highlights that it is impossible for countries in a globalised economy to increase economic growth by simultaneously cutting public spending. Exploring the rationale for austerity in the 2010s, he traces the build-up of public debt in the U.S. and European countries back to governments' bailouts of the financial sector during and after the 2008 financial crisis and the use of countercyclical policies in the Great Recession, in contrast to austerity advocates' narrative of governmental profligacy (with the exception of Greece). With regard to the European debt crisis, Blyth explains how the institutional setup of the Eurozone—in particular the ECB's narrow focus on inflation control, countries' inability to individually devalue their currencies after the adoption of the euro, and the financial sector's overleveraging—created a situation in which solvent northern European countries were unwilling to financially support already highly indebted southern European countries without the latter's commitment to austerity because of moral hazard.

Thereafter, Blyth goes on to trace austerity's origins to classical economists' (Locke, Hume, Smith) negative view of government debt, its translation into liquidationism in the U.S. (Schumpeter) and into the Treasury view in the United Kingdom, and the intellectual dominance of Keynesian deficit spending over austerity in the wake of the Great Depression. He then describes how the doctrine of austerity survived intellectually within Germany's ordoliberalism due to its lack of emphasis on business cycle management as well as within the Austrian School of Economics in the U.S. (Mises, Hayek, Rothbard), how the displacement of Keynesianism by monetarism (Friedman) focused macroeconomic policy on inflation control through central bank independence and dismissed unemployment as voluntary, and how the public choice school's theory of political business cycles (Buchanan, Stigler) criticized the negative role of democracy for fiscal stability, thereby setting the stage for a revival of austerity in the form of the IMF's structural adjustment programmes.

Blyth also explains the intellectual genesis of the theory of expansionary fiscal contraction at the hands of Alesina, Tabellini, Ardagna, and Perotti. Turning towards austerity's empirical record between 1914 and 2012, Blyth critically investigates the effectiveness of austerity in the interwar period, emphasizing the role of austerity in the rise of fascism, and dismisses the case studies from the 1980s and early 2000s (mostly Baltic and Eastern European countries) typically advanced by austerity advocates on various grounds. Finally, comparing Ireland's 2008 bank bailout with Iceland's 2009 default, Blyth questions whether the financial sector is worth saving and suggests financial repression and more progressive taxation as alternatives to austerity with regard to reducing governments' public debt.

== Reception ==
Overall, Austerity received positive reviews. Writing in the New York Review of Books, Paul Krugman praises Austerity for its account of the academic genesis of the theory of expansionary fiscal contraction. By contrast, while calling Blyth's description and criticism of austerity "valid and compelling" and his views on the Eurozone Debt Crisis "cogent", Lawrence Summers criticizes Blyth for dismissing austerity summarily, e.g., ignoring the success of U.S.-American and Canadian non-recessionary fiscal consolidations in the 1990s, and Blyth's acceptance of a meltdown of the financial system. Finally, Austerity has been cited by austerity critics in a broad variety of media, e.g., by Larry Elliott in The Guardian.

Austerity was selected among the Best Books of 2013 by reviews in the Financial Times and Bloomberg News.
