= Alberto Alesina =

Italian economist (1957–2020)

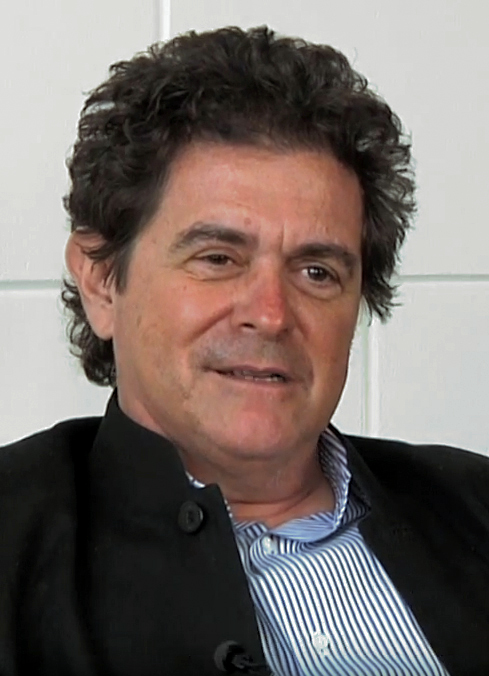
- Alesina in 2013
- Born: 29 April 1957; Broni, Lombardy, Italy
- Died: 23 May 2020 (aged 63)

Academic background
- Education: Bocconi University; Harvard University
- Alma mater: Harvard University (PhD); Bocconi University (Laurea)
- Doctoral advisor: Jeffrey Sachs

Academic work
- Discipline: Macroeconomics; Political economy
- Institutions: Harvard University
- Doctoral students: Silvana Tenreyro
- Website: Information at IDEAS / RePEc

Alberto Francesco Alesina (29 April 1957 – 23 May 2020) was an Italian economist who was the Nathaniel Ropes Professor of Political Economy at Harvard University from 2003 until his death in 2020. He was known principally as an economist of politics and culture, and was famed for his usage of economic tools to study social and political issues. He was described as having "almost single-handedly" established the modern field of political economy, and as a likely contender for the Nobel Memorial Prize in Economic Sciences.

== Background and professional life ==
Alberto Alesina was born in Broni in 1957. His father was an engineer and industrial manager, and his mother was a teacher. He attended a classical lyceum in Milan, before enrolling at Bocconi University to study economics and social sciences, where he received a laurea in 1981. He then went on to graduate study at Harvard University, where he received a PhD in economics in 1986. His doctoral adviser at Harvard was Jeffrey Sachs.

From 1986 to 1987, Alesina was a postdoctoral fellow in political economy at Carnegie Mellon University. He joined the faculty of Harvard University in 1987, where he was an assistant professor of economics and government between 1987 and 1993, the Paul Sack Associate Professor of Political Economy from 1991 to 1993, a full professor of economics and government from 1993 to 2003, and the Nathaniel Ropes Professor of Political Economy from 2003 till his death in 2020. He chaired the Department of Economics at Harvard between 2003 and 2006.

Alesina became a research associate at the NBER in 1993, and founded its Political Economy Program in 2006. He was a co-editor of the Quarterly Journal of Economics between 1998 and 2004. He was elected a Fellow of the Econometric Society in 2002, and was elected to the American Academy of Arts and Sciences in 2006.

Alesina's work covered a variety of topics at the confluence of politics, sociology, and economics, including:

- The politics of business cycles
- The political economy of fiscal policy and budget deficits
- The process of European integration
- Stabilization policies in high inflation countries
- The political economy of immigration
- Currency unions
- The political-economic determinants of redistributive policies
- Differences in the welfare state in the US and Europe
- Differences in the economic system in the US and Europe
- The effect of alternative electoral systems on economic policies
- The determination of the choice of different electoral systems

During the Great Recession in Europe, Alesina aroused controversy as an advocate of fiscal austerity. He argued that austerity can be expansionary, in situations where government reduction in spending is offset by greater increases in aggregate demand (private consumption, private investment and exports). A credible fiscal consolidation would reduce private actors' uncertainty and lower the risk premium. Assuming that Ricardian equivalence and the permanent income hypothesis hold, actors' expected future wealth would increase and induce them to consume more. In October 2009, Alesina and Silvia Ardagna published "Large Changes in Fiscal Policy: Taxes Versus Spending", a widely cited academic paper aimed at showing that fiscal austerity measures did not hurt economies, and actually helped their recovery.

Alesina's advocacy of austerity was strongly criticised by Nobel laureate Paul Krugman, who published "How the Case for Austerity Has Crumbled" in the New York Review of Books in June 2013, in which he noted the influence of pro-austerity articles authored by Alesina and his supporters, and described the work of the "Bocconi Boys" as "a full frontal assault on the Keynesian proposition that cutting spending in a weak economy produces further weakness".

More recently, studies by the IMF and others have cast doubt on the methodological underpinning of Alesina's work, and conclude that the evidence is more likely to suggest a contractionary effect of fiscal consolidation. However, Alesina along with Francesco Giavazzi and Carlo Favero published counterarguments that suggested some austerity programmes (such as the one in Britain) had produced above-average economic growth and stronger economic performance than had been predicted by the IMF, and argued that spending cuts were a more effective way to reduce the debt-to-GDP ratio than tax increases.

On 23 May 2020, while hiking with his wife, Susan, Alesina died; the cause was diagnosed as a heart attack. In 2021, Harvard University renamed its Seminar on Political Economy in Alesina's honor.

== Selected publications ==
=== Books ===
- 1995. Partisan Politics, Divided Government and the Economy (with Howard Rosenthal). Cambridge. Description & TOC and preview.
- 1997a. Political Cycles and the Macroeconomy (with Nouriel Roubini & Gerald D. Cohen). MIT Press. Description and chapter-preview links.
- 1997b. Designing Macroeconomic Policy for Europe (with Olivier Blanchard et al.), CEPR, London.
- 2003. The Size of Nations (with Enrico Spolaore). MIT Press. Description and chapter-preview links.
- 2004. Fighting Poverty in the US and Europe: A World of Difference (with Edward Glaeser). Oxford. Description, and "slide-show" summary, and chapter-preview links via "select" click.
- 2006. The Future of Europe: Reform or Decline (with Francesco Giavazzi), MIT Press. Description, Introduction, preview.

=== Articles ===
Press + to enlarge small-font links below.

- 1987. "Macroeconomic Policy in a Two-Party System as a Repeated Game," Quarterly Journal of Economics, 102(3), p pp. 651–678.
- 1993. "Central Bank Independence and Macroeconomic Performance: Some Comparative Evidence" (with Lawrence H. Summers), Journal of Money, Credit and Banking, 25(2), p pp. 151–162.
- 1994. "Distributive Politics and Economic Growth" (with Dani Rodrik), Quarterly Journal of Economics, 109(2), p pp. 465–490.
- 1995. "The Political Economy of Budget Deficits" (with Roberto Perotti), IMF Staff Papers, 42(1), pp. pp. 1–31.
- 1997. "On the Number and Size of Nations" (with Enrico Spolaore), Quarterly Journal of Economics, 112(4), p pp. 1027–1056.
- 1999. "Public Goods and Ethnic Divisions" (with Reza Baqir & William Easterly), Quarterly Journal of Economics, 114(4), pp. 1243–1284.
- 2000. "Who Gives Foreign Aid to Whom and Why?" (with David Dollar), Journal of Economic Growth, 5(1), p pp. 33–63.
- 2003. "Fractionalization" (with Arnaud Devleeschauwer et al.), Journal of Economic Growth, 8(2), p pp. 155–194.
- 2004. "Inequality and Happiness: Are Europeans and Americans Different?" (with Rafael Di Tellab and Robert MacCulloch), Journal of Public Economics, 88(9–10), pp. 2009–2042 (close Bookmarks tab).
- 2005. "Ethnic Diversity and Economic Performance" (with Eliana La Ferrara), Journal of Economic Literature, 43(3), pp. 762–800.
- 2013. "On the Origins of Gender Roles: Women and the Plough" (with Paola Giuliano and Nathan Nunn), Quarterly Journal of Economics. 2013; 128 (2) : 469–530.
- 2016. "Birthplace Diversity and Economic Prosperity" (with Johann Harnoss and Hillel Rapoport), Journal of Economic Growth, vol. 21(2), pages 101-138 doi:10.1007/s10887-016-9127-6
