= Carlo A. Favero =

Italian economist

Carlo Ambrogio Favero (born 5 January 1962, in Milan) is an Italian economist who is Deutsche Bank Professor of Asset Pricing and Quantitative Finance at Bocconi University.

== Biography ==
Favero graduated in Economics (DES) from Bocconi in 1984, obtained an MSc in economics from the LSE (1986) and a DPhil in Economics from Oxford University (1989) under the supervision of David Hendry and John Muellbauer. He has been Lecturer in Economics at Queen Mary College University of London before joining Bocconi in 1994. He is a research fellow of CEPR (www.cepr.org) in the International Macroeconomics programme and a fellow of the Innocenzo Gasparini Institute for the Economic Research at Bocconi University (www.igier.unibocconi.it). He has been advisor to the Italian Ministry of Economics and Finance and he has been consulting the European Commission, the World Bank and the European Central Bank.

His current research interests are in the areas of macroeconomics and finance. He is author of Applied Macroeconometrics (2001) and a co-author (with Alberto Alesina and Francesco Giavazzi) of Austerity. When it Works and When it Doesn't (2019). In 2015 he was awarded by the Fraser Institute, jointly with A. Alesina and F. Giavazzi, the Addington Prize in Measurement for the article The Output Effect Of Fiscal Consolidations Plans published on the Journal of International Economics. He is a contributor to lavoce.info and voxeu.org. According to his Google Scholar Profile his H-Index in 2018 is 44, with 8500 citations

== Bibliography ==
- Alesina A., C.A. Favero and F. Giavazzi, Austerity. When it works and When it Doesn't., Princeton, Princeton University Press, ISBN 9780691185019
- Favero C.A., Applied Macroeconometrics, Oxford, Oxford University Press, 2001, ISBN 9780198775836
