= Mark Blyth =

Scottish-American political scientist (born 1967)

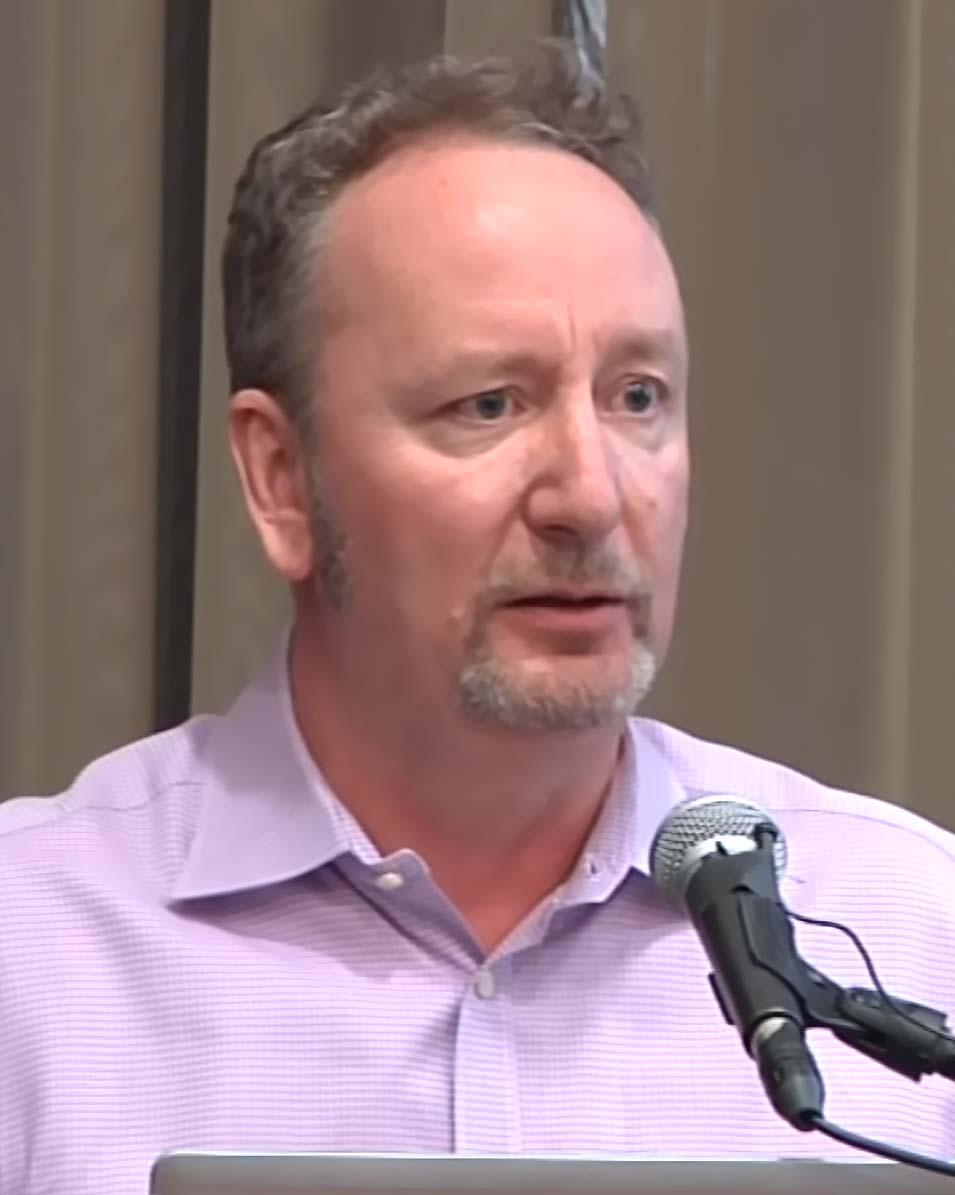
- Blyth in 2018
- Born: 29 September 1967 (age 58); Dundee, Scotland
- Citizenship: United Kingdom, United States
- Education: Strathclyde University (BA); Columbia University (MA, MPhil, PhD)
- Known for: Global Trumpism
- Awards: Financial Times' 'Books of the Year 2013' for Austerity
- Scientific career
- Fields: Political economy
- Workplaces: Watson School of International and Public Affairs and the Department of Political Science, Brown University
- Thesis: Great Transformations: Economic Ideas and Political Change in the Twentieth Century (1999)
- Doctoral advisor: Mark Kesselman, Hendrick Spruyt
- Website: polisci.brown.edu/people/mark-blyth

Mark McGann Blyth (born 29 September 1967) is a Scottish-American political economist. He is currently the William R. Rhodes Professor of International Economics and Professor of International and Public Affairs at Brown University. At Brown, Blyth additionally directs the William R. Rhodes Center for International Economics and Finance at the Watson School of International and Public Affairs.

== Early life ==
Blyth grew up in Dundee, Scotland and was raised by his grandmother after his mother died shortly after childbirth. He had a lisp and a stammer as a kid: later played bass in rock bands and noted in an interview that "I was a musician from age 14 to 28. I've released five or six albums, but all with independent labels that never went anywhere. If they had, I wouldn't be here. I'd be lying on a beach with Heidi Klum."

== Education and career ==
Blyth received a BA degree in political science from the University of Strathclyde in 1990. In 1991, Blyth received a Walker Bequest award from the University of Strathclyde and a Scottish International Educational Trust Award for Study in the United States. He eventually became a US citizen. He went on to complete post-graduate studies in the field, being awarded an MA in 1993, an MPhil in 1995, and a PhD degree in 1999 at Columbia University. He later joined the Faculty of Political Science at Johns Hopkins University as Assistant Professor in 1997, then Associate Professor from 2005 to 2009.

In 2009, Blyth became a Professor of International Political Economy in the Department of Political Science at Brown University. In 2014, he was appointed as the Eastman Professor of Political Economy as part of a joint appointment between Brown's Watson Institute for International Studies and Department of Political Science. As of 2020, he served as both Director and William R. Rhodes '57 Professor at the Rhodes Center for International Economics and Finance.

Blyth is known for his scholarship on economic ideas having contributed to an "ideational turn" in International Political Economy by offering sociologically informed approaches to markets and politics.

Blyth is a vociferous critic of austerity, particularly in his 2013 book, Austerity: The History of a Dangerous Idea – described by Salon's Elias Esquith as "necessary reading," a primer in economics, and polemical history of the austerity. Esquith praised Blyth's work for its "insight into austerity's lineage, its theories, its champions and its failures...[where Blyth] explains the damaging consequences of austerity in Europe and the U.S." In the book, Blyth criticises the argument advanced by austerity advocates as "a canard" and "complete horseshit".

In 2016, Blyth compared "Trumpism" to similar anti-establishment movements across the developed world. In August 2020, he expressed support for Scottish independence from the United Kingdom, and currently sits on the Scottish Government's Advisory Council for the transformation of Scotland's economy, chaired by Cabinet Secretary for Finance and the Economy, Kate Forbes.

== Personal life ==
Blyth is married.

== Works ==
=== Books ===
- Blyth, Mark (2002). Great Transformations: Economic Ideas and Institutional Change in the Twentieth Century (Hardcover ed.). Cambridge: Cambridge University Press. ISBN 0-521-81176-7.
- Blyth, Mark, ed. (2009). Routledge Handbook of International Political Economy (IPE): IPE as a Global Conversation. Routledge. ISBN 9781135984007.
- Abdelal, Rawi; Blyth, Mark; Parsons, Craig, eds. (2010). Constructing the International Economy. Cornell University Press. ISBN 9780801475887.
- Blyth, Mark (2013). Austerity: The History of a Dangerous Idea (Hardcover ed.). Oxford: Oxford University Press. ISBN 978-0-19-982830-2.
- Boyd, William Lowe; Kerchner, Charles T.; Blyth, Mark, eds. (2008). The Transformation of Great American School Districts: How Big Cities are Reshaping Public Education. Cambridge: Harvard Education Press. ISBN 9781891792939.
- Matthijs, Matthias; Blyth, Mark, eds. (2015). The Future of the Euro. Oxford: Oxford University Press. ISBN 9780190233235.
- Abdelel, Rawi; Blyth, Mark (2015). "Just who put you in charge? We did: CRAs and the politics of ratings". In Cooley, Alexander; Snyder, Jack (eds.). Ranking the World; Grading States as a Tool of Global Governance (Hardcover ed.). Cambridge: Cambridge University Press. pp. 39–59. ISBN 978-1-107-09813-8.
- Lonergan, Eric; Blyth, Mark (2020). Angrynomics (Hardcover ed.). New York: Columbia University Press. ISBN 9781788212786.
- Blyth, Mark; Pontusson, Jonas; Baccaro, Lucio, eds. (2022). Diminishing Returns: The New Politics of Growth and Stagnation. New York: Oxford University Press. ISBN 9780197607855.+
- Blyth, Mark; Fraccaroli, Nicolò (2025). Inflation: A Guide for Users and Losers (1st ed.). W. W. Norton & Company, Incorporated. ISBN 978-1-324-10614-2.

=== Selected articles ===
A more complete list can be found on Mark Blyth's curriculum vitae.

- Blyth, Mark (2 September 2013). "'Austerity' as ideology: A reply to my critics". Comparative European Politics. 11 (6): 737–751. doi:10.1057/cep.2013.25. S2CID 144461892.
- Blyth, Mark; Lonergan, Eric (2014). "Print Less but Transfer More; Why Central Banks Should Give Money Directly to the People". Foreign Affairs. 93 (September/October 2014).
- Blyth, Mark; Helgadóttir, Oddný; Kring, William (2016). "Ideas and Historical Institutionalism". In Fioretos, Orfeo; Falleti, Tulia G; Sheingate, Adam D (eds.). The Oxford Handbook of Historical Institutionalism (1st ed.). Oxford: Oxford University Press. pp. 142–162. ISBN 978-0-19-966281-4.
- Blyth, Mark (1 September 2016). "Policies to overcome stagnation: the crisis, and the possible futures, of all things euro". European Journal of Economics and Economic Policies: Intervention. 13 (2): 215–228. doi:10.4337/ejeep.2016.02.06. hdl:10419/277361.
- Blyth, Mark; Matthijs, Matthias (17 April 2017). "Black Swans, Lame Ducks, and the mystery of IPE's missing macroeconomy". Review of International Political Economy. 24 (2): 203–231. doi:10.1080/09692290.2017.1308417. S2CID 157518024.
