= Austerity =

Economic policies intended to reduce government budget deficits

Austerity is a set of political-economic policies that aim to reduce government budget deficits through spending cuts, tax increases, or a combination of both. There are three primary types of austerity measures: higher taxes to fund spending, raising taxes while cutting spending, and lower taxes and lower government spending. Austerity measures are often used by governments that find it difficult to borrow or meet their existing obligations to pay back loans. The measures are meant to reduce the budget deficit by bringing government revenues closer to expenditures. Proponents of these measures state that this reduces the amount of borrowing required and may also demonstrate a government's fiscal discipline to creditors and credit rating agencies and make borrowing easier and cheaper as a result.

In most macroeconomic models, austerity policies which reduce government spending lead to increased unemployment in the short term. These reductions in employment usually occur directly in the public sector and indirectly in the private sector. Where austerity policies are enacted using tax increases, these can reduce consumption by cutting household disposable income. Reduced government spending can reduce gross domestic product (GDP) growth in the short term as government expenditure is itself a component of GDP. In the longer term, reduced government spending can reduce GDP growth if, for example, cuts to education spending leave a country's workforce less able to do high-skilled jobs or if cuts to infrastructure investment impose greater costs on business than they saved through lower taxes. In both cases, if reduced government spending leads to reduced GDP growth, austerity may lead to a higher debt-to-GDP ratio than the alternative of the government running a higher budget deficit. In the aftermath of the Great Recession, austerity measures in many European countries were followed by rising unemployment and slower GDP growth. The result was increased debt-to-GDP ratios despite reductions in budget deficits.

Theoretically in some cases, particularly when the output gap is low, austerity can have the opposite effect and stimulate economic growth. For example, when an economy is operating at or near capacity, higher short-term deficit spending (stimulus) can cause interest rates to rise, resulting in a reduction in private investment, which in turn reduces economic growth. Where there is excess capacity, the stimulus can result in an increase in employment and output. Alberto Alesina, Carlo Favero, and Francesco Giavazzi argue that austerity can be expansionary in situations where government reduction in spending is offset by greater increases in aggregate demand (private consumption, private investment, and exports).

== History ==
The origin of modern austerity measures is mostly undocumented among academics. Austerity was codified in Brussels and Genoa beginning in 1920. Another historical example of contemporary austerity is Fascist Italy during a liberal period of the economy from 1922 to 1925. The fascist government utilized austerity policies to prevent the democratization of Italy following World War I, with Luigi Einaudi, Maffeo Pantaleoni, Umberto Ricci and Alberto de' Stefani leading this movement. Austerity measures used by the Weimar Republic of Germany were unpopular and contributed towards the increased support for the Nazi Party in the 1930s.

== Justifications ==
Austerity measures are typically pursued if there is a threat that a government cannot honour its debt obligations. This may occur when a government has borrowed in currencies that it has no right to issue, for example a South American country that borrows in US dollars. It may also occur if a country uses the currency of an independent central bank that is legally restricted from buying government debt, for example in the Eurozone.

In such a situation, banks and investors may lose confidence in a government's ability or willingness to pay, and either refuse to roll over existing debts, or demand extremely high interest rates. International financial institutions such as the International Monetary Fund (IMF) may demand austerity measures as part of Structural Adjustment Programmes when acting as lender of last resort.

Austerity policies may also appeal to the wealthier class of creditors, who prefer low inflation and the higher probability of payback on their government securities by less profligate governments. More recently austerity has been pursued after governments became highly indebted by assuming private debts following banking crises. (This occurred after Ireland assumed the debts of its private banking sector during the European debt crisis. This rescue of the private sector resulted in calls to cut back the profligacy of the public sector.)

According to Mark Blyth, the concept of austerity emerged in the 20th century, when large states acquired sizable budgets. However, Blyth argues that the theories and sensibilities about the role of the state and capitalist markets that underline austerity emerged from the 17th century onwards. Austerity is grounded in liberal economics' view of the state and sovereign debt as deeply problematic. Blyth traces the discourse of austerity back to John Locke's theory of private property and derivative theory of the state, David Hume's ideas about money and the virtue of merchants, and Adam Smith's theories on economic growth and taxes. On the basis of classic liberal ideas, austerity emerged as a doctrine of neoliberalism in the 20th century.

Economist David M. Kotz suggests that the implementation of austerity measures following the 2008 financial crisis was an attempt to preserve the neoliberal capitalist model.

== Theoretical considerations ==
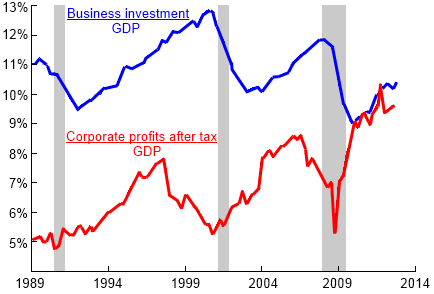
Red: corporate profits after tax and inventory valuation adjustment. Blue: nonresidential fixed investment, both as fractions of US GDP, 1989–2012.

In the 1930s during the Great Depression, anti-austerity arguments gained more prominence. John Maynard Keynes became a well known anti-austerity economist, arguing that "The boom, not the slump, is the right time for austerity at the Treasury."

Contemporary Keynesian economists argue that budget deficits are appropriate when an economy is in recession, to reduce unemployment and help spur GDP growth. According to Paul Krugman, since a government is not like a household, reductions in government spending during economic downturns worsen the crisis.

Across an economy, one person's spending is another person's income. In other words, if everyone is trying to reduce their spending, the economy can be trapped in what economists call the paradox of thrift, worsening the recession as GDP falls. In the past this has been offset by encouraging consumerism to rely on debt, but after the 2008 crisis, this has looked like a less and less viable option for sustainable economics.

Krugman argues that, if the private sector is unable or unwilling to consume at a level that increases GDP and employment sufficiently, then the government should be spending more in order to offset the decline in private spending. Keynesian theory is proposed as being responsible for post-war boom years, before the 1970s, and when public sector investment was at its highest across Europe, partially encouraged by the Marshall Plan.

An important component of economic output is business investment, but there is no reason to expect it to stabilize at full utilization of the economy's resources. High business profits do not necessarily lead to increased economic growth. (When businesses and banks have a disincentive to spend accumulated capital, such as cash repatriation taxes from profits in overseas tax havens and interest on excess reserves paid to banks, increased profits can lead to decreasing growth.)

Economists Kenneth Rogoff and Carmen Reinhart wrote in April 2013, "Austerity seldom works without structural reforms – for example, changes in taxes, regulations and labor market policies – and if poorly designed, can disproportionately hit the poor and middle class. Our consistent advice has been to avoid withdrawing fiscal stimulus too quickly, a position identical to that of most mainstream economists."

To help improve the US economy, they (Rogoff and Reinhart) advocated reductions in mortgage principal for 'underwater homes' – those whose negative equity (where the value of the asset is less than the mortgage principal) can lead to a stagnant housing market with no realistic opportunity to reduce private debts.

=== Multiplier effects ===
In October 2012, the IMF announced that its forecasts for countries that implemented austerity programs have been consistently overoptimistic, suggesting that tax hikes and spending cuts have been doing more damage than expected and that countries that implemented fiscal stimulus, such as Germany and Austria, did better than expected.

The IMF reported that this was due to fiscal multipliers that were considerably larger than expected: for example, the IMF estimated that fiscal multipliers based on data from 28 countries ranged between 0.9 and 1.7. In other words, a 1% GDP fiscal consolidation (i.e., austerity) would reduce GDP between 0.9% and 1.7%, thus inflicting far more economic damage than the 0.5 previously estimated in IMF forecasts.

In many countries, little is known about the size of multipliers, as data availability limits the scope for empirical research.

For these countries, Nicoletta Batini, Luc Eyraud and Anke Weber propose a simple method—dubbed the "bucket approach"—to come up with reasonable multiplier estimates. The approach bunches countries into groups (or "buckets") with similar multiplier values, based on their characteristics, and taking into account the effect of (some) temporary factors such as the state of the business cycle.

Different tax and spending choices of equal magnitude have different economic effects:

For example, the US Congressional Budget Office estimated that the payroll tax (levied on all wage earners) has a higher multiplier (impact on GDP) than does the income tax (which is levied primarily on wealthier workers). In other words, raising the payroll tax by $1 as part of an austerity strategy would slow the economy more than would raising the income tax by $1, resulting in less net deficit reduction.

In theory, it would stimulate the economy and reduce the deficit if the payroll tax were lowered and the income tax raised in equal amounts.

=== Crowding in or out ===
The term "crowding out" refers to the extent to which an increase in the budget deficit offsets spending in the private sector. Economist Laura Tyson wrote in June 2012, "By itself an increase in the deficit, either in the form of an increase in government spending or a reduction in taxes, causes an increase in demand". How this affects output, employment, and growth depends on what happens to interest rates:

When the economy is operating near capacity, government borrowing to finance an increase in the deficit causes interest rates to rise and higher interest rates reduce or "crowd out" private investment, reducing growth. This theory explains why large and sustained government deficits take a toll on growth: they reduce capital formation. But this argument rests on how government deficits affect interest rates, and the relationship between government deficits and interest rates varies.

When there is considerable excess capacity, an increase in government borrowing to finance an increase in the deficit does not lead to higher interest rates and does not crowd out private investment. Instead, the higher demand resulting from the increase in the deficit bolsters employment and output directly. The resultant increase in income and economic activity in turn encourages, or "crowds in", additional private spending.

Some argue that the "crowding-in" model is an appropriate solution for current economic conditions.

=== Government budget balance as a sectoral component ===
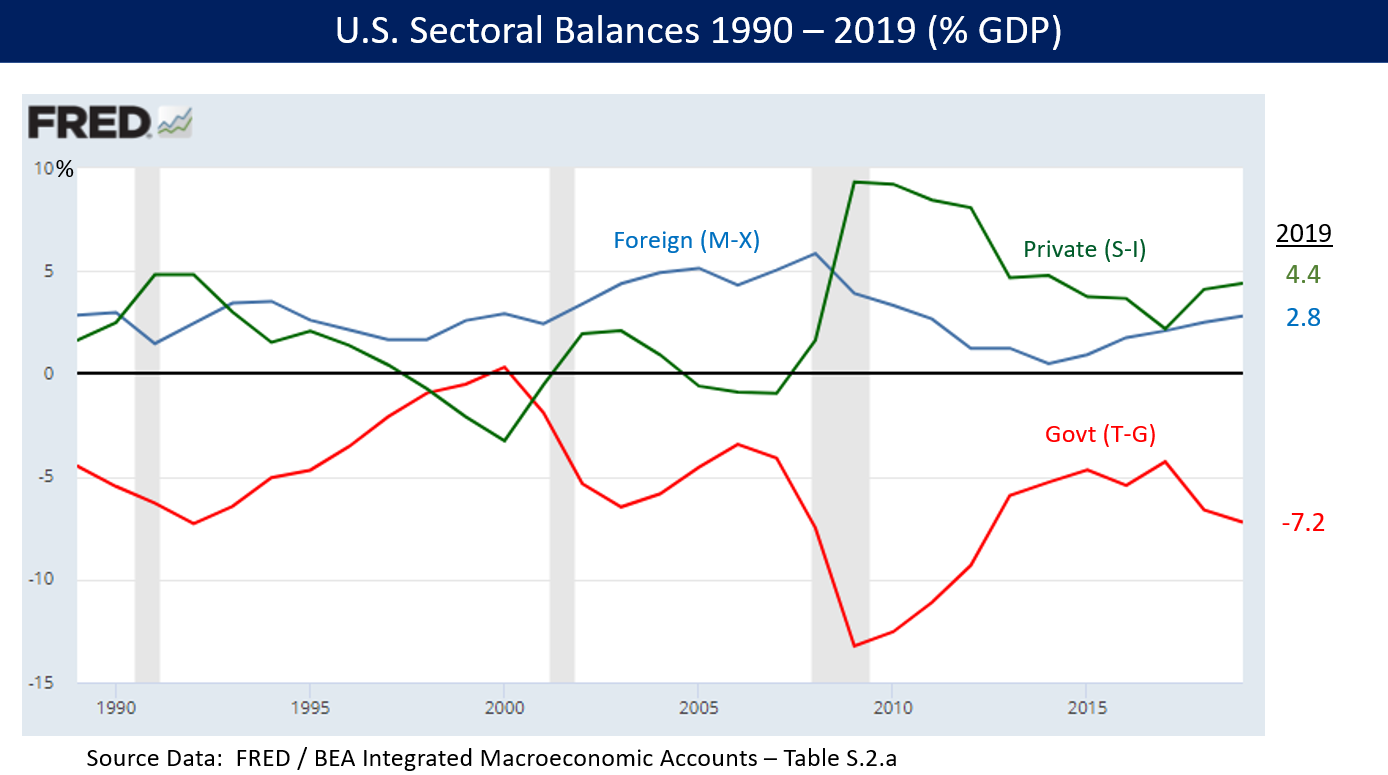
Sectoral balances in US economy 1990–2012. By definition, the three balances must net to zero. Since 2009, the US capital surplus and private-sector surplus have driven a government budget deficit.

According to economist Martin Wolf, the US and many Eurozone countries experienced rapid increases in their budget deficits in the wake of the 2008 crisis as a result of significant private-sector retrenchment and ongoing capital account surpluses.

Policy choices had little to do with these deficit increases. This makes austerity measures counterproductive. Wolf explained that government fiscal balance is one of three major financial sectoral balances in a country's economy, along with the foreign financial sector (capital account) and the private financial sector.

By definition, the sum of the surpluses or deficits across these three sectors must be zero. In the US and many Eurozone countries other than Germany, a foreign financial surplus exists because capital is imported (net) to fund the trade deficit. Further, there is a private-sector financial surplus because household savings exceed business investment.

By definition, a government budget deficit must exist so all three net to zero: for example, the US government budget deficit in 2011 was approximately 10% of GDP (8.6% of GDP of which was federal), offsetting a foreign financial surplus of 4% of GDP and a private-sector surplus of 6% of GDP.

Wolf explained in July 2012 that the sudden shift in the private sector from deficit to surplus forced the US government balance into deficit: "The financial balance of the private sector shifted towards surplus by the almost unbelievable cumulative total of 11.2 per cent of gross domestic product between the third quarter of 2007 and the second quarter of 2009, which was when the financial deficit of US government (federal and state) reached its peak. ... No fiscal policy changes explain the collapse into massive fiscal deficit between 2007 and 2009, because there was none of any importance. The collapse is explained by the massive shift of the private sector from financial deficit into surplus or, in other words, from boom to bust."

Wolf also wrote that several European economies face the same scenario and that a lack of deficit spending would likely have resulted in a depression. He argued that a private-sector depression (represented by the private- and foreign-sector surpluses) was being "contained" by government deficit spending.

Economist Paul Krugman also explained in December 2011 the causes of the sizable shift from private-sector deficit to surplus in the US: "This huge move into surplus reflects the end of the housing bubble, a sharp rise in household saving, and a slump in business investment due to lack of customers."

One reason why austerity can be counterproductive in a downturn is due to a significant private-sector financial surplus, in which consumer savings is not fully invested by businesses. In a healthy economy, private-sector savings placed into the banking system by consumers are borrowed and invested by companies. However, if consumers have increased their savings but companies are not investing the money, a surplus develops.

Business investment is one of the major components of GDP. For example, a US private-sector financial deficit from 2004 to 2008 transitioned to a large surplus of savings over investment that exceeded $1 trillion by early 2009, and remained above $800 billion into September 2012. Part of this investment reduction was related to the housing market, a major component of investment. This surplus explains how even significant government deficit spending would not increase interest rates (because businesses still have access to ample savings if they choose to borrow and invest it, so interest rates are not bid upward) and how Federal Reserve action to increase the money supply does not result in inflation (because the economy is awash with savings with no place to go).

Economist Richard Koo described similar effects for several of the developed world economies in December 2011: "Today private sectors in the US, the UK, Spain, and Ireland (but not Greece) are undergoing massive deleveraging [paying down debt rather than spending] in spite of record low interest rates. This means these countries are all in serious balance sheet recessions. The private sectors in Japan and Germany are not borrowing, either. With borrowers disappearing and banks reluctant to lend, it is no wonder that, after nearly three years of record low interest rates and massive liquidity injections, industrial economies are still doing so poorly. Flow of funds data for the US show a massive shift away from borrowing to savings by the private sector since the housing bubble burst in 2007. The shift for the private sector as a whole represents over 9 percent of US GDP at a time of zero interest rates. Moreover, this increase in private sector savings exceeds the increase in government borrowings (5.8 percent of GDP), which suggests that the government is not doing enough to offset private sector deleveraging."

== Framing of the debate surrounding austerity ==
Dissenting scholars have argued that how the debate surrounding austerity is framed has a heavy impact on the view of austerity in the public eye, and how the public understands macroeconomics as a whole. Wren-Lewis, for example, coined the term 'mediamacro', which refers to "the role of the media reproducing particularly corrosive forms of economic illiteracy—of which the idea that deficits are ipso facto 'bad' is a strong example." This can go as far as ignoring economists altogether; however, it often manifests itself as a drive in which a minority of economists whose ideas about austerity have been thoroughly debunked being pushed to the front to justify public policy, such as in the case of Alberto Alesina (2009), whose pro-austerity works were "thoroughly debunked by the likes of the economists, the IMF, and the Centre for Budget and Policy Priorities (CBPP)." Radical left political theorist Richard Seymour argued that the debate must be reframed as a social and class movement, and its impact judged accordingly, since statecraft is viewed as the main goal.

Sociologist Aaron Major has highlighted how the OECD and associated international finance organisations have framed the debate to promote austerity, for example, the concept of 'wage-push inflation' which ignores the role played by the profiteering of private companies, and seeks to blame inflation on wages being too high.

== Empirical considerations ==
Some opinion polls find voters tend to prefer mostly cutting government spending to close the government budget deficit instead of tax increases.

According to a 2020 study, austerity increases the risk of default in situations of severe fiscal stress, but reduces the risk of default in situations of low fiscal stress.

=== Europe ===
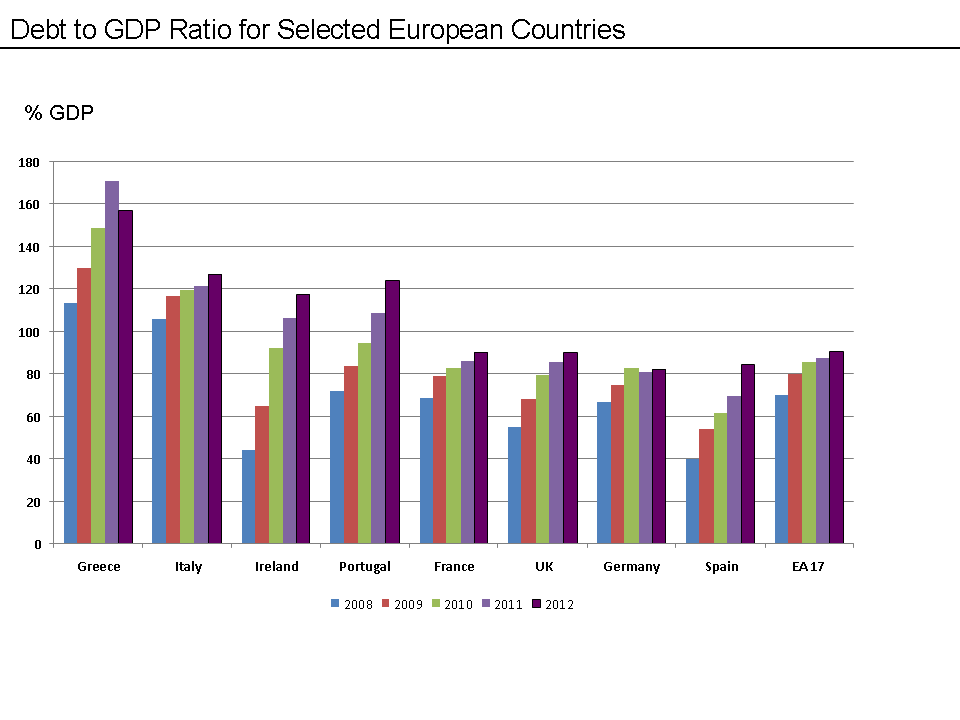
Public debt to GDP ratio for selected European countries – 2008 to 2012. Source data: Eurostat

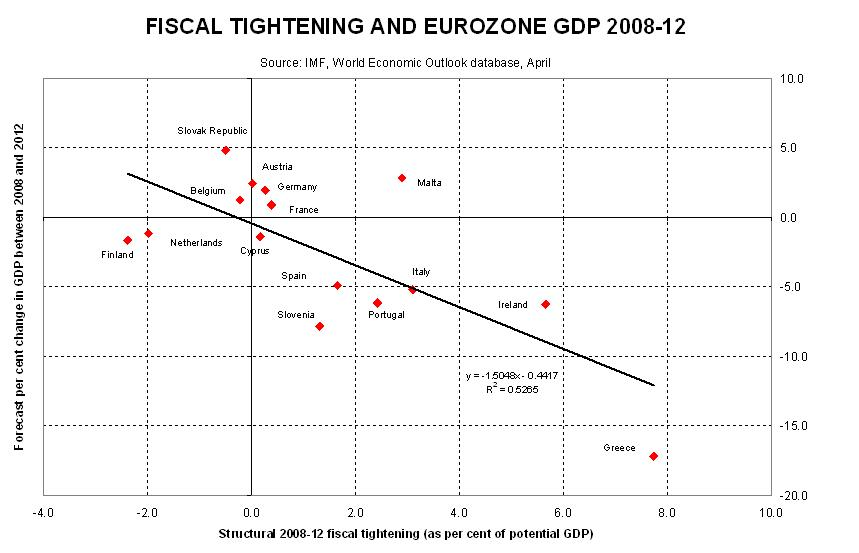
Relationship between fiscal tightening (austerity) in eurozone countries with their GDP growth rate, 2008–12

==== Eurozone ====
During the European debt crisis, many countries embarked on austerity programs, reducing their budget deficits relative to GDP from 2010 to 2011.

According to the CIA World Factbook, Greece decreased its budget deficit from 10.4% of GDP in 2010 to 9.6% in 2011. Iceland, Italy, Ireland, Portugal, France, and Spain also decreased their budget deficits from 2010 to 2011 relative to GDP.

With the exception of Germany, each of these countries had public-debt-to-GDP ratios that increased from 2010 to 2011, as indicated in the chart at right. Greece's public-debt-to-GDP ratio increased from 143% in 2010 to 165% in 2011 Indicating despite declining budget deficits GDP growth was not sufficient to support a decline in the debt-to-GDP ratio for these countries during this period.

Eurostat reported that the overall debt-to-GDP ratio for the EA17 was 70.1% in 2008, 80.0% in 2009, 85.4% in 2010, 87.3% in 2011, and 90.6% in 2012. Further, real GDP in the EA17 declined for six straight quarters from Q4 2011 to Q1 2013.

Unemployment is another variable considered in evaluating austerity measures. According to the CIA World Factbook, from 2010 to 2011, the unemployment rates in Spain, Greece, Ireland, Portugal, and the UK increased. France and Italy had no significant changes, while in Germany and Iceland the unemployment rate declined. Eurostat reported that Eurozone unemployment reached record levels in March 2013 at 12.1%, up from 11.6% in September 2012 and 10.3% in 2011. Unemployment varied significantly by country.

Economist Martin Wolf analyzed the relationship between cumulative GDP growth in 2008 to 2012 and total reduction in budget deficits due to austerity policies in several European countries during April 2012 (see chart at right). He concluded, "In all, there is no evidence here that large fiscal contractions budget deficit reductions bring benefits to confidence and growth that offset the direct effects of the contractions. They bring exactly what one would expect: small contractions bring recessions and big contractions bring depressions." Changes in budget balances (deficits or surpluses) explained approximately 53% of the change in GDP, according to the equation derived from the IMF data used in his analysis.

Similarly, economist Paul Krugman analyzed the relationship between GDP and reduction in budget deficits for several European countries in April 2012 and concluded that austerity was slowing growth. He wrote: "this also implies that 1 euro of austerity yields only about 0.4 euros of reduced deficit, even in the short run. No wonder, then, that the whole austerity enterprise is spiraling into disaster."

===== Greece =====
The Greek government-debt crisis brought a package of austerity measures, put forth by the EU and the IMF mostly in the context of the three successive bailouts the country endured from 2010 to 2018; it was met with great anger by the Greek public, leading to riots and social unrest. On 27 June 2011, trade union organizations began a 48-hour labour strike in advance of a parliamentary vote on the austerity package, the first such strike since 1974.

Massive demonstrations were organized throughout Greece, intended to pressure members of parliament into voting against the package. The second set of austerity measures was approved on 29 June 2011, with 155 out of 300 members of parliament voting in favor. However, one United Nations official warned that the second package of austerity measures in Greece could pose a violation of human rights.

Around 2011, the IMF started issuing guidance suggesting that austerity could be harmful when applied without regard to an economy's underlying fundamentals.

In 2013, it published a detailed analysis concluding that "if financial markets focus on the short-term behavior of the debt ratio, or if country authorities engage in repeated rounds of tightening in an effort to get the debt ratio to converge to the official target", austerity policies could slow or reverse economic growth and inhibit full employment. Keynesian economists and commentators such as Paul Krugman have suggested that this has, in fact, been occurring, with austerity yielding worse results in proportion to the extent to which it has been imposed.

Overall, Greece lost 25% of its GDP during the crisis. Although the government debt increased only 6% between 2009 and 2017 (from €300 bn to €318 bn) – thanks, in part, to the 2012 debt restructuring – the critical debt-to-GDP ratio shot up from 127% to 179% mostly due to the severe GDP drop during the handling of the crisis. In all, the Greek economy suffered the longest recession of any advanced capitalist economy to date, overtaking the US Great Depression. As such, the crisis adversely affected the populace as the series of sudden reforms and austerity measures led to impoverishment and loss of income and property, as well as a small-scale humanitarian crisis. Unemployment shot up from 8% in 2008 to 27% in 2013 and remained at 22% in 2017. As a result of the crisis, Greek political system has been upended, social exclusion increased, and hundreds of thousands of well-educated Greeks left the country.

===== France =====
In April and May 2012, France held a presidential election in which the winner, François Hollande, had opposed austerity measures, promising to eliminate France's budget deficit by 2017 by canceling recently enacted tax cuts and exemptions for the wealthy, raising the top tax bracket rate to 75% on incomes over one million euros, restoring the retirement age to 60 with a full pension for those who have worked 42 years, restoring 60,000 jobs recently cut from public education, regulating rent increases, and building additional public housing for the poor. In the legislative elections in June, Hollande's Socialist Party won a majority capable of enabling the immediate enactment of the promised reforms. Despite significant tax hikes in the first two years and record low interest rates on French government bonds government spending was not significantly reduced and consequently the deficit remained above the target of 3%.

===== Latvia =====
Latvia's economy returned to growth in 2011 and 2012, outpacing the 27 nations in the EU, while implementing significant austerity measures. Advocates of austerity argue that Latvia represents an empirical example of the benefits of austerity, while critics argue that austerity created unnecessary hardship with the output in 2013 still below the pre-crisis level. While Anders Åslund maintains that internal devaluation was not opposed by the Latvian public, Jokubas Salyga has recently chronicled widespread protests against austerity in the country.

According to the CIA World Fact Book, "Latvia's economy experienced GDP growth of more than 10% per year during 2006–07, but entered a severe recession in 2008 as a result of an unsustainable current account deficit and large debt exposure amid the softening world economy. Triggered by the collapse of the second largest bank, GDP plunged 18% in 2009. The economy has not returned to pre-crisis levels despite strong growth, especially in the export sector in 2011–12. The IMF, EU, and other international donors provided substantial financial assistance to Latvia as part of an agreement to defend the currency's peg to the euro in exchange for the government's commitment to stringent austerity measures.

The IMF/EU program successfully concluded in December 2011. The government of Prime Minister Valdis Dombrovskis remained committed to fiscal prudence and reducing the fiscal deficit from 7.7% of GDP in 2010, to 2.7% of GDP in 2012." The CIA estimated that Latvia's GDP declined by 0.3% in 2010, then grew by 5.5% in 2011 and 4.5% in 2012. Unemployment was 12.8% in 2011 and rose to 14.3% in 2012. Latvia's currency, the Lati, fell from $0.47 per US dollar in 2008 to $0.55 in 2012, a decline of 17%. Latvia entered the euro zone in 2014. Latvia's trade deficit improved from over 20% of GDP in 2006 to 2007 to under 2% GDP by 2012.

Eighteen months after harsh austerity measures were enacted (including both spending cuts and tax increases), economic growth began to return, although unemployment remained above pre-crisis levels. Latvian exports have skyrocketed and both the trade deficit and budget deficit have decreased dramatically. More than one-third of government positions were eliminated, and the rest received sharp pay cuts. Exports increased after goods prices were reduced due to private business lowering wages in tandem with the government.

Paul Krugman wrote in January 2013 that Latvia had yet to regain its pre-crisis level of employment. He also wrote, "So we're looking at a Depression-level slump, and 5 years later only a partial bounceback; unemployment is down but still very high, and the decline has a lot to do with emigration. It's not what you'd call a triumphant success story, any more than the partial US recovery from 1933 to 1936—which was actually considerably more impressive—represented a huge victory over the Depression. And it's in no sense a refutation of Keynesianism, either. Even in Keynesian models, a small open economy can, in the long run, restore full employment through deflation and internal devaluation; the point, however, is that it involves many years of suffering".

Latvian Prime Minister Valdis Dombrovskis defended his policies in a television interview, stating that Krugman refused to admit his error in predicting that Latvia's austerity policy would fail. Krugman had written a blog post in December 2008 entitled "Why Latvia is the New Argentina", in which he argued for Latvia to devalue its currency as an alternative or in addition to austerity.

==== United Kingdom ====
===== Post war austerity =====
Following the Second World War the United Kingdom had huge debts, large commitments, and had sold many income producing assets. Rationing of food and other goods which had started in the war continued for some years.

===== 21st century austerity programme =====
David Cameron, Prime Minister of the United Kingdom, 2010–2016

Following the 2008 financial crisis, a period of economic recession began in the UK. The austerity programme was initiated in 2010 by the Conservative and Liberal Democrat coalition government, despite some opposition from the academic community. In his June 2010 budget speech, the Chancellor George Osborne identified two goals. The first was that the structural current budget deficit would be eliminated to "achieve cyclically-adjusted current balance by the end of the rolling, five-year forecast period". The second was that national debt as a percentage of GDP would fall. The government intended to achieve both of its goals through substantial reductions in public expenditure. This was to be achieved by a combination of public spending reductions and tax increases. Economists Alberto Alesina, Carlo A. Favero and Francesco Giavazzi, writing in Finance & Development in 2018, argued that deficit reduction policies based on spending cuts typically have almost no effect on output, and hence form a better route to achieving a reduction in the debt-to-GDP ratio than raising taxes. The authors commented that the UK government austerity programme had resulted in growth that was higher than the European average and that the UK's economic performance had been much stronger than the International Monetary Fund had predicted. This claim was challenged most strongly by Mark Blyth, whose 2014 book on austerity claims that austerity not only fails to stimulate growth, but effectively passes that debt down to the working classes. As such, many academics such as Andrew Gamble view Austerity in Britain less as an economic necessity, and more as a tool of statecraft, driven by ideology and not economic requirements. A study published in The BMJ in November 2017 found the Conservative government austerity programme had been linked to approximately 120,000 deaths since 2010; however, this was disputed, for example on the grounds that it was an observational study which did not show cause and effect. More studies claim adverse effects of austerity on population health, which include an increase in the mortality rate among pensioners which has been linked to unprecedented reductions in income support, an increase in suicides and the prescription of antidepressants for patients with mental health issues, and an increase in violence, self-harm, and suicide in prisons.

=== United States ===
The United States's response to the 2008 economic crash was largely influenced by Wall Street and IMF interests, who favored fiscal retrenchment in the face of the economic crash. Evidence exists to suggest that Pete Peterson (and the Petersonites) have heavily influenced US policy on economic recovery since the Nixon era, and presented itself in 2008, despite austerity measures being "wildly out of step with public opinion and reputable economic policy...[and showing] anti-Keynesian bias of supply-side economics and a political system skewed to favor Wall Street over Main Street". The nuance of the economic logic of Keynesianism is, however, difficult to put across to the American Public, and compares poorly to the simplistic message which blames government spending, which might explain Obama's preferred position of a halfway point between economic stimulus followed by austerity, which led to him being criticized by economists such as Joseph Stiglitz. The US began sweeping austerity measures to services such as healthcare, human services, US grants, and federal jobs during the second presidency of Donald Trump.

== Controversy ==
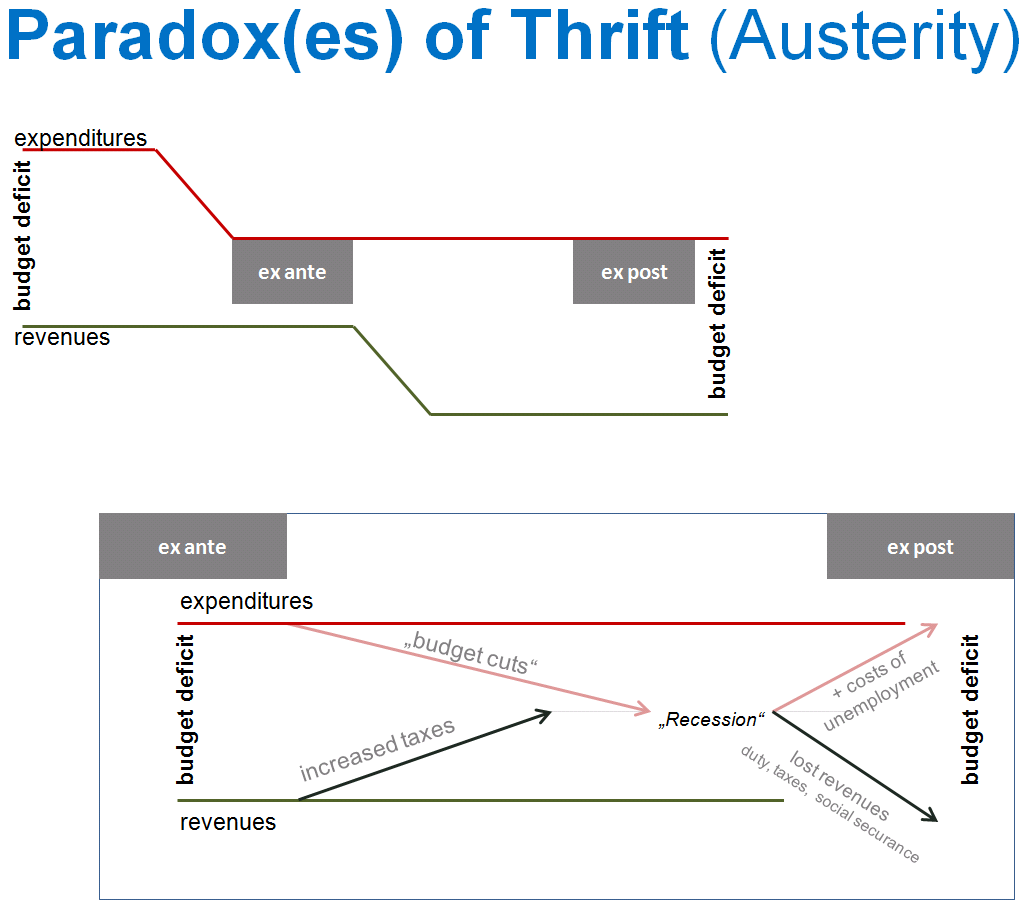
Austerity can result in a paradox of thrift.

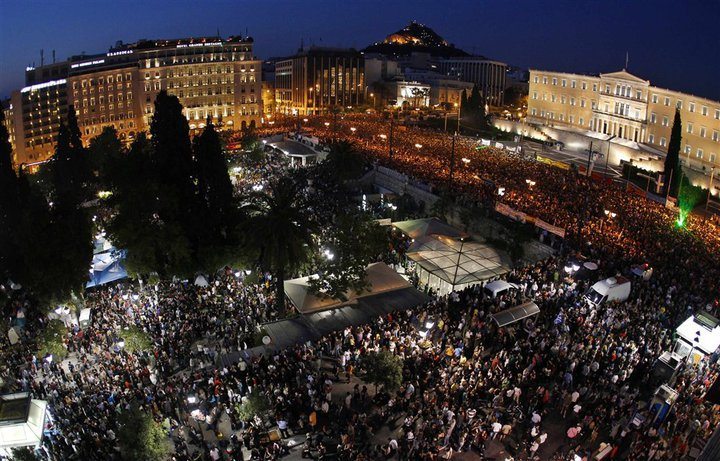
Austerity protest in Athens, 2011

Austerity programs can be controversial. In the Overseas Development Institute (ODI) briefing paper "The IMF and the Third World", the ODI addresses five major complaints against the IMF's austerity conditions. Complaints include such measures being "anti-developmental", "self-defeating", and tending "to have an adverse impact on the poorest segments of the population".

In many situations, austerity programs are implemented by countries that were previously under dictatorial regimes, leading to criticism that citizens are forced to repay the debts of their oppressors.

In 2009, 2010, and 2011, workers and students in Greece and other European countries demonstrated against cuts to pensions, public services, and education spending as a result of government austerity measures.

Following the announcement of plans to introduce austerity measures in Greece, massive demonstrations occurred throughout the country aimed at pressing parliamentarians to vote against the austerity package. In Athens alone, 19 arrests were made, while 46 civilians and 38 policemen had been injured by 29 June 2011. The third round of austerity was approved by the Greek parliament on 12 February 2012 and met strong opposition, especially in Athens and Thessaloniki, where police clashed with demonstrators.

Opponents argue that austerity measures depress economic growth and ultimately cause reduced tax revenues that outweigh the benefits of reduced public spending. Moreover, in countries with already anemic economic growth, austerity can engender deflation, which inflates existing debt. Such austerity packages can also cause the country to fall into a liquidity trap, causing credit markets to freeze up and unemployment to increase. Opponents point to cases in Ireland and Spain in which austerity measures instituted in response to financial crises in 2009 proved ineffective in combating public debt and placed those countries at risk of defaulting in late 2010.

In October 2012, the IMF announced that its forecasts for countries that implemented austerity programs have been consistently overoptimistic, suggesting that tax hikes and spending cuts have been doing more damage than expected and that countries that implemented fiscal stimulus, such as Germany and Austria, did better than expected. These data have been scrutinized by the Financial Times, which found no significant trends when outliers like Germany and Greece were excluded. Determining the multipliers used in the research to achieve the results found by the IMF was also described as an "exercise in futility" by Professor Carlos Vegh of the University of Michigan. Moreover, Barry Eichengreen of the University of California, Berkeley and Kevin H. O'Rourke of Oxford University write that the IMF's new estimate of the extent to which austerity restricts growth was much lower than historical data suggest.

According to a 2020 study, which used survey experiments in the UK, Portugal, Spain, Italy and Germany, voters strongly disapprove of austerity measures, in particular spending cuts. Voters disapprove of fiscal deficits but not as strongly as austerity. A 2021 study found that incumbent European governments that implemented austerity measures in the Great Recession lost support in opinion polls.

Austerity has been blamed for at least 120,000 deaths between 2010 and 2017 in the UK, with one study putting it at 130,000 and another at 30,000 in 2015 alone. The first study added that "no firm conclusions can be drawn about cause and effect, but the findings back up other research in the field" and campaigners have claimed that cuts to benefits, healthcare and mental health services lead to more deaths including through suicide.

== Age of austerity ==
The term "age of austerity" was popularised by UK Conservative Party leader David Cameron in his keynote speech to the Conservative Party forum in Cheltenham on 26 April 2009, in which he committed to end years of what he called "excessive government spending". Theresa May claimed that "Austerity is over" as of 3 October 2018, a statement which was almost immediately met with criticism on the reality of its central claim, particularly in relation to the high possibility of a substantial economic downturn due to Brexit.

== Word of the year ==
Merriam-Webster's Dictionary named the word austerity as its "Word of the year" for 2010 because of the number of web searches this word generated that year. According to the president and publisher of the dictionary, "austerity had more than 250,000 searches on the dictionary's free online [website] tool" and the spike in searches "came with more coverage of the debt crisis".

== Examples of austerity ==
- Albania — 1962
- Argentina — 1952, 1985, 1998–2003, 2012, 2018–2019, 2022–
- Australia — 2014
- Brazil — 2003–2006, 2015–2018
- Canada — 1994
- China — 2013
- Cuba — 1991–2000, 2008
- Czech Republic — 2010
- Ecuador — 2017–
- Estonia — 2007–2009
- European countries — 2012
- Finland — 1991–1999, 2011–2015, 2015–2019, 2023–
- France — 1926–1929, 1932, 1934–1936, 1938–1940, 1958, 1976–1981, 1982–1986, 1995, 2010, 2014, 2024–
- Germany — 1930, 2011
- Greece — 2010–2018
- Haiti — 1915–1934 (American occupation)
- Ireland — 2010–2014
- Israel — 1949–1959
- Italy — 1922–1925, 2011–2013
- Japan — 1949 (American Occupation), 1997–1998, 2010
- Latvia — 2009–2013
- Mexico — 1985, 2020
- Netherlands — 1982–1990, 2003–2006, 2011–2014
- Nicaragua — 1997, 2018
- Palestinian Authority — 2006
- Portugal — 1977–1979, 1983–1985, 2002–2015
- Puerto Rico — 2009–2018
- Romania — Ceaușescu's 1981–1989 austerity, 2010, 2025
- Spain — 1979, 2010–2014
- Sweden — 1995–1997
- United States — 1921, 1937, 1946, Omnibus Budget Reconciliation Act of 1993
- United Kingdom — during and after the two World Wars, 1976–1979, 2011–2019, 2021–2024
- Venezuela — 1989, 2016

== Criticism ==
According to economist David Stuckler and physician Sanjay Basu in their study The Body Economic: Why Austerity Kills, a health crisis is being triggered by austerity policies, including up to 10,000 additional suicides that have occurred across Europe and the US since the introduction of austerity programs.

Much of the acceptance of austerity in the general public has centred on the way debate has been framed, and relates to an issue with representative democracy; since the public do not have widely available access to the latest economic research, which is highly critical of economic retrenchment in times of crisis, the public must rely on which politician sounds most plausible.

An analysis by Hübscher et al. of 166 elections across Europe since 1980 demonstrates that austerity measures lead to increased electoral abstention and a rise in votes for non-mainstream parties, thereby exacerbating political polarization. Their detailed examination of specific austerity episodes reveals that new, small, and radical parties are the primary beneficiaries of such policies.

A study by Gabriel et al., analyzing elections in 124 European regions from eight countries between 1980 and 2015, found that fiscal consolidations increased the vote share of extreme parties, lowered voter turnout, and heightened political fragmentation. Notably, after the European debt crisis, a 1% reduction in regional public spending resulted in an approximate 3 percentage point rise in the vote share of extreme parties. The findings suggest that austerity measures diminish trust in political institutions and encourage support for more extreme political positions.

According to a 2020 study, austerity does not pay off in terms of reducing the default premium in situations of severe fiscal stress. Rather, austerity increases the default premium. However, in situations of low fiscal stress, austerity does reduce the default premium. The study also found that increases in government consumption had no substantial impact on the default premium.

Clara Mattei, assistant professor of economics at the New School for Social Research, posits that austerity is less of a means to "fix the economy" and is more of an ideological weapon of class oppression wielded by economic and political elites in order to suppress revolts and unrest by the working class public and close off any alternatives to the capitalist system. In this, she argues that austerity "is not about spending less but about spending in favor of the economic and financial elite and to the detriment of the majority of the population." Mattei traces the origins of modern austerity to post-World War I Britain and Italy, when it served as a "powerful counteroffensive" to rising working class agitation and anti-capitalist sentiment. In this, she quotes British economist G. D. H. Cole writing on the British response to the economic downturn of 1921:

"The big working-class offensive had been successfully stalled off; and British capitalism, though threatened with economic adversity, felt itself once more safely in the saddle and well able to cope, both industrially and politically, with any attempt that might still be made from the labour side to unseat it."

=== DeLong–Summers condition ===
J. Bradford DeLong and Lawrence Summers explained why an expansionary fiscal policy is effective in reducing a government's future debt burden, pointing out that the policy has a positive impact on its future productivity level. They pointed out that when an economy is depressed and its nominal interest rate is near zero, the real interest rate charged to firms $r^{f}$ is linked to the output as $\frac{\partial r^{f} }{\partial Y} = - \delta$. This means that the rate decreases as the real GDP increases, and the actual fiscal multiplier $\mu$ is higher than that in normal times; a fiscal stimulus is more effective for the case where the interest rates are at the zero bound. As the economy is boosted by government spending, the increased output yields higher tax revenue, and so we have

$$\frac{\partial D}{\partial G} = 1 - \mu \tau  \; ,$$

where $\tau$ is a baseline marginal tax-and-transfer rate. Also, we need to take account of the economy's long-run growth rate $g$, as a steady economic growth rate may reduce its debt-to-GDP ratio. Then we can see that an expansionary fiscal policy is self-financing:

$$(r - g) dD  - \tau dY =  (r - g )(1 - \mu \tau) dG - \tau \eta \mu dG$$
$$\frac{\partial B}{\partial G} = (r-g) (1 - \mu \tau) - \tau \eta \mu  \; ,$$

as long as $\frac{\partial B}{\partial G}$ is less than zero. Then we can find that a fiscal stimulus makes the long-term budget in surplus if the real government borrowing rate satisfies the following condition:

$$(r-g) (1 - \mu \tau) < \tau \eta \mu$$

=== Impacts on short-run budget deficit ===
Research by Gauti Eggertsson et al. indicates that a government's fiscal austerity measures actually increase its short-term budget deficit if the nominal interest rate is very low. In normal time, the government sets the tax rates $\tau_{s}, \tau_{i}$ and the central bank controls the nominal interest rate $i$. If the rate is so low that monetary policies cannot mitigate the negative impact of the austerity measures, the significant decrease of tax base makes the revenue of the government and the budget position worse. If the multiplier is

$$\frac{\partial Y}{\partial G} > \gamma
= \frac{1 + \tau_{s} + \theta  \sigma^{-1} \psi }{\tau_{i} + \tau_{s} + \theta}$$

then we have $\frac{\partial D}{\partial G} < 0 \;$, where

$$\theta =   \frac{b}{Y } (1+i)   \frac{  \kappa }{ (1-\beta \mu) }   \; .$$

That is, the austerity measures are counterproductive in the short-run, as long as the multiplier is larger than a certain level $\gamma$. This erosion of the tax base is the effect of the endogenous component of the deficit. Therefore, if the government increases sales taxes, then it reduces the tax base due to its negative effect on the demand, and it upsets the budget balance.

=== No credit risk ===
For a country that has its own currency, its government can create credits by itself, and its central bank can keep the interest rate close to or equal to the nominal risk-free rate. Former Federal Reserve chairman Alan Greenspan says that the probability that the US defaults on its debt repayment is zero, because the US government can print money. The Federal Reserve Bank of St. Louis says that the US government's debt is denominated in US dollars; therefore the government will never go bankrupt, though it may introduce the risk of inflation.

== Alternatives to austerity ==
A number of alternative plans have been used and proposed as an alternative to implementing austerity measures, examples include:

- Infrastructure-based development and Productivity-improving technologies
- New Deal (a series of programs, public work projects, financial reforms, and regulations enacted by President Franklin D. Roosevelt in the United States between 1933 and 1939 in response to the Great Depression in the United States).

=== Combining stimulus and austerity ===
IMF managing director Christine Lagarde wrote in August 2011, "For the advanced economies, there is an unmistakable need to restore fiscal sustainability through credible consolidation plans. At the same time we know that slamming on the brakes too quickly will hurt the recovery and worsen job prospects. So fiscal adjustment must resolve the conundrum of being neither too fast nor too slow. Shaping a Goldilocks fiscal consolidation is all about timing. What is needed is a dual focus on medium-term consolidation and short-term support for growth. That may sound contradictory, but the two are mutually reinforcing. Decisions on future consolidation, tackling the issues that will bring sustained fiscal improvement, create space in the near term for policies that support growth."

Federal Reserve Chair Ben Bernanke wrote in September 2011, "the two goals—achieving fiscal sustainability, which is the result of responsible policies set in place for the longer term, and avoiding creation of fiscal headwinds for the recovery—are not incompatible. Acting now to put in place a credible plan for reducing future deficits over the long term, while being attentive to the implications of fiscal choices for the recovery in the near term, can help serve both objectives."

== See also ==
- Functional finance
- Fossil fuel subsidies
- Planned shrinkage
- Programme commun (French reform programme cancelled by austerity turn)
- Trickle-down economics
- Growth in a Time of Debt
