= Frederick Leith-Ross =

Scottish economist

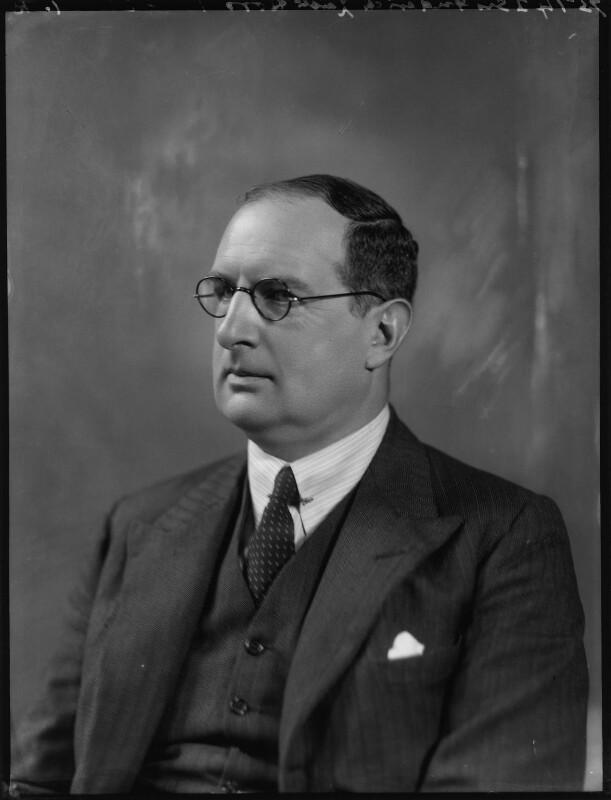
Leith-Ross in 1932

Sir Frederick William Leith-Ross, GCMG, KCB (4 February 1887 – 22 August 1968) was a Scottish economist who was chief adviser to the UK government from 1932 to 1945.

== Biography ==
Leith-Ross was born in Saint Pierre, Mauritius, the son of Frederick William Arbuthnot Leith-Ross, a banker, and his Dutch wife, Sina van Houten, the daughter of politician Samuel van Houten. He grew up with his grandfather John Leith Ross, 5th Laird of Arnage Castle at the family estate in Ellon, Scotland. He was the brother of the artist Harry Leith-Ross (1886–1973). After graduating with a double first from Balliol College, Oxford, he joined the Treasury in 1909.

Leith-Ross was appointed as a Private Secretary to H. H. Asquith, the prime minister, in 1911. He was appointed a Companion of the Order of the Bath (CB) in the 1925 Birthday Honours in recognition of his service as British Member of the Finance Board of the Reparation Commission. Between 1932 and 1945 he was chief economic advisor to the UK government: he is known for advancing the economic theory of "Treasury View", popular in the 1930s. Leith-Ross was active in negotiations with Germany prior to the Second World War, such as the Anglo-German Payments Agreement, but is best remembered for the "Leith-Ross mission" to China in 1935, when he was the UK's chief representative in a mission to persuade China to reform its currency. He was also chairman of a bank in China and chairman of P&O.

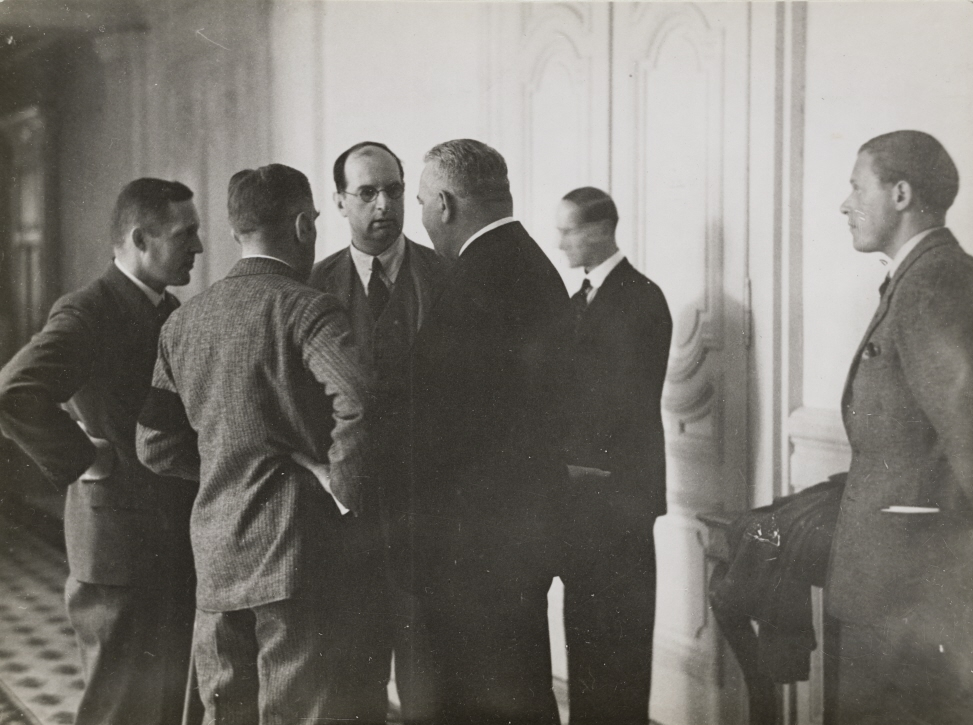
Leith-Ross (third from left, glasses) at the Lausanne Conference in July 1932

During the Second World War, Leith-Ross helped to lay the foundation for international humanitarian relief efforts in the postwar period. Following a speech of Prime Minister Winston Churchill to the British Parliament on 20 August 1940 that rhetorically raised the prospect of Britain bringing the German and Austrian peoples "food, freedom, and peace" upon the defeat of the Nazi regime in Europe, Leith-Ross was appointed to head an ad hoc governmental committee to address the question of how surpluses could be raised to deliver on such a pledge. In September 1941, his committee was reconstituted as the Inter-Allied Committee on Post-War Requirements, in which form it collaborated with the European governments in exile in London, on estimating the needs for food, raw materials, and other necessities in the first six-month period after liberation.

Leith-Ross's committee laid the groundwork for what eventually became the United Nations Relief and Rehabilitation Administration (UNRRA), founded in November 1943. As deputy under the UNRRA's first director-general, the American Herbert Lehman, Leith-Ross contributed to the difficult work of organizing and staffing the new international agency, which, in the end, received the mandate not of feeding German civilians but, rather, of fulfilling basic needs of the millions of people displaced from their homelands as a consequence of the war, who needed assistance to be repatriated or to otherwise re-establish their lives in the postwar period. The term displaced persons, which came into parlance at that time, and shaped the understanding of the postwar landscape, may have even originated in Leith-Ross's committee and the report it produced.

In 1912 Leith-Ross married Prudence Staples. Their children included the author and biographer Prudence Leith-Ross who was born in 1922. His 1968 autobiography is entitled Money Talks: Fifty years of international finance.

Government offices
Preceded by none	Director-General of the Ministry of Economic Warfare; 1939–1942; With: The Earl of Drogheda (1940–1942)	Succeeded by The Earl of Drogheda
