= Expansionary fiscal contraction =

Attempting to increase economic growth through austerity

The Expansionary Fiscal Contraction (EFC) hypothesis predicts that, under certain circumstances, a major reduction in government spending (such as austerity measures) that changes future expectations about taxes and government spending will expand private consumption, resulting in overall economic expansion. This hypothesis was introduced by Francesco Giavazzi and Marco Pagano in 1990 in a paper that used the fiscal restructurings of Denmark and Ireland in the 1980s as examples.

The concept that fiscal contraction can result in growth is commonly known as "expansionary austerity".

== Theoretical basis ==
The authors describe this as the "German view" of budget-cutting. The German view also includes the more traditional assumption that reducing government expenditures as a percent of GDP will lessen crowding out, making "room for the private sector to expand" which only operates when the economy is near full employment. The authors also did not provide a model for EFC but rather described conditions under which it was observed in Denmark from 1983 to 1984 and Ireland from 1987 to 1989, a period when the world was undergoing rapid interest rate declines and worldwide growth. These conditions included a significant currency devaluation prior to assuming a peg against a stable currency (Germany in Denmark's case), budget improvement through significant tax increases and spending cuts and sufficient liquidity that current disposable income did not constrain consumption. The authors stated that when current disposable income constrained consumption, "Keynesian textbook propositions seem to recover their predictive power, as witnessed by the 7% drop in real consumption in 1982 during the first Irish stabilization."

== Research support and disagreements ==
A 2009 study of the 1983–1986 Denmark fiscal contraction applied structural VAR/event study methodology to test the EFC hypothesis. This study concluded that the Danish fiscal contraction had not hurt economic expansion, that the EFC hypothesis may work but only for large and credible fiscal consolidations, and that other reforms may have also played an important role. The authors warned that economic contraction, as predicted by traditional Keynesian economics, would most likely result if government contraction was incremental rather than major and structural. An analysis of EFC using Neo-Keynesian modeling concluded that while there were situations in which consumption could be increased through fiscal contraction in all cases it was negative or neutral to employment so there must have been additional factors at work to explain the reduction in unemployment in Denmark and Ireland in the 1980s. The study concluded that Irish growth was actually lower than would have been expected without the fiscal contraction using the UK growth during the same period as a comparison. Above-average growth in Denmark was probably due to a supply-side shock in the form of the removal of wage indexation mechanisms and a temporary wage freeze which resulted in real wages contracting by 4 percent between 1982 and 1986.

An IMF working paper by Guajardo, Leigh, and Pescatori published in Journal of the European Economic Association on Expansionary Austerity and the Expansionary Fiscal Contraction hypothesis that examined changes in policy designed to reduce deficits found that austerity had contractionary effects on private domestic demand and GDP. This report contradicted the conclusion of an NBER report, where Alesina and Ardagna delivered evidence in support of the Expansionary Fiscal Contraction hypothesis.

The inconsistency results from the method of finding the periods of austerity policy in economic history. Guajardo, Leigh, and Pescatori studied narrative records in order to identify the timings of the austerity at the Treasury. In contrast, Alesina and Ardagna analyzed the changes in cyclically adjusted primary balance (CAPB) and defined austerity policy as a 1.5-percent reduction in CAPB. The two techniques of identifying expenditure reductions deliver significantly different results but neither can be considered superior.

A more recent working paper by Breuer criticises Alesina and Ardagna for committing the fallacy of reverse causation. It follows that the decrease in the expenditure-GDP ratio and increase in GDP were the same phenomenon. Increases in GDP lead to a decrease in the expenditure-GDP ratio and not the other way around. They claim that the statistical methods adopted by the NBER report fails to properly account for cyclical movements in the expenditure-GDP ratio.

Research carried out by the United Kingdom's Office for Budget Responsibility indicates that the austerity policies enacted in the United Kingdom had the effects of reducing the 2011–2012 economic growth by 1.4 percent.

== See also ==
- "Debating the Confidence Fairy" - Robert Skidelsky
