= Anglo-German Payments Agreement =

1934 agreement between Nazi Germany and the UK

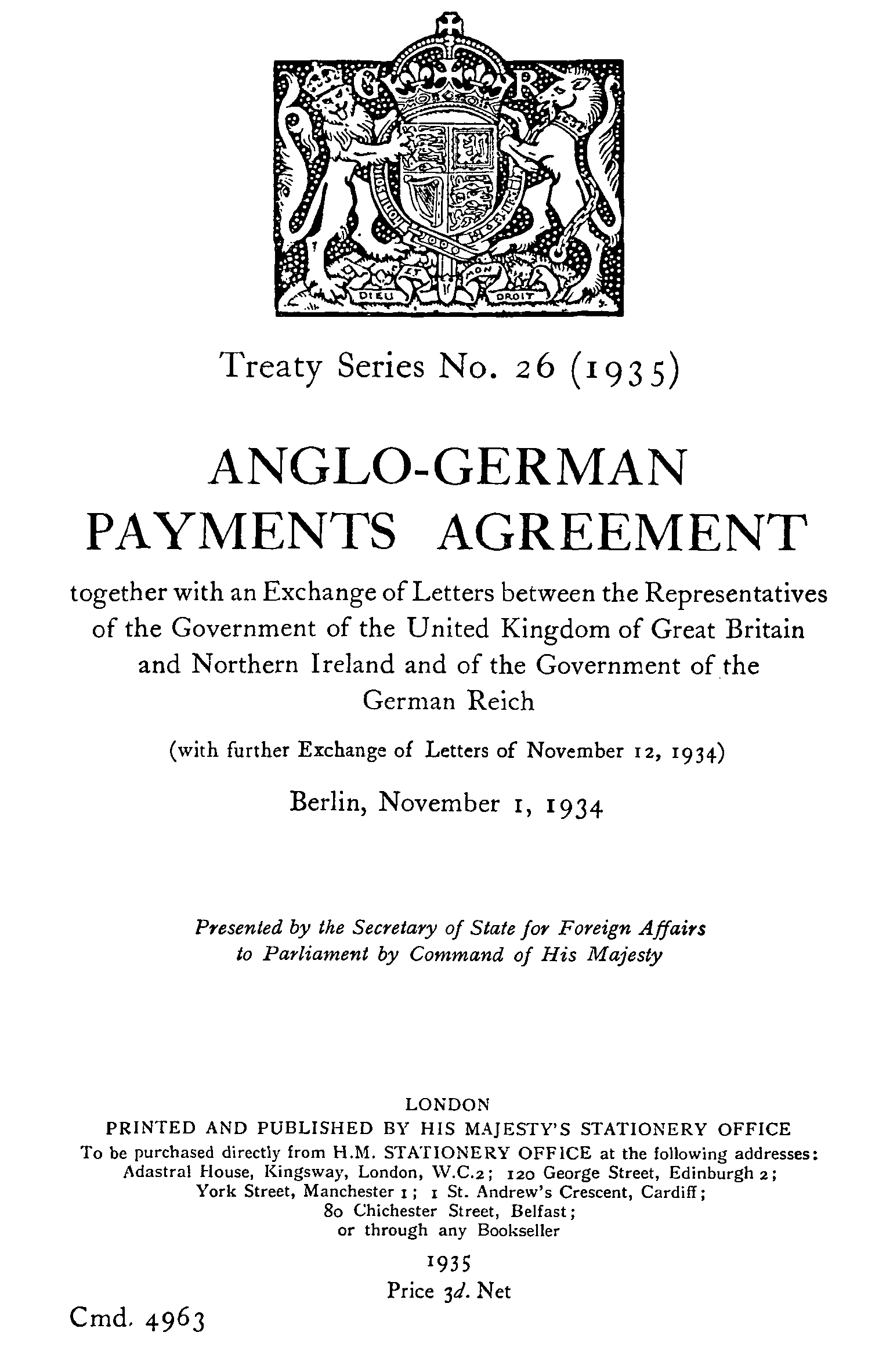
- Type: Financial agreement
- Context: German debt, trade relations
- Signed: 1 November 1934
- Amendment: 1 July 1938
- Expiration: September 1939
- Negotiators: Sir Frederick Leith-Ross (UK); Hjalmar Schacht (Germany)
- Parties: United Kingdom; Germany

The Anglo-German Payments Agreement was a bilateral agreement signed on 1 November 1934 between the governments of the United Kingdom and Nazi Germany. The agreement aimed to address German debt obligations, particularly in relation to the Dawes and Young plans as part of World War I reparations, and set a framework for trade relations between the two countries during a period of increasing political tension in Europe. The agreement remained in place until the outbreak of World War II in 1939.

== History ==
=== Threat of a clearing house (June 1933–January 1934) ===
As part of the Dawes and Young reparations agreements, Germany sold two issues of bonds to creditor nations in 1924 and 1930 respectively, commercialising Germany's reparations obligations by borrowing from private investors.

Following Adolf Hitler's ascension to Chancellor of Germany in January 1933, British concerns arose over the deteriorating conditions faced by the holders of these bonds. On 9 June 1933, the newly reappointed President of the Reichsbank, Hjalmar Schacht, had announced a six-month moratorium (to take effect from 1 July) on the payments of all public and private-long term debts contracted before July 1931, including on the Dawes and Young loans, in line with the Nazi argument that these latter loans were a form of tribute.

The British government contemplated retaliatory measures, namely the possibility of imposing a unilateral Anglo-German clearing arrangement to safeguard British interests. The proposed arrangement would have required debts owed by British importers of German goods to be paid and settled through a clearing house in London, instead of being paid to German creditors directly. German debts with British creditors, including bonds, would then be forcibly repaid through this clearing house, an arrangement disadvantageous to Germany as the debts would be paid in sterling. In early July 1933, however, the proposal was not seen as feasible by the Treasury, as imports from Germany had fallen due to British tariffs.

The British government took no decisive action until autumn 1933, when it learned that the Dutch and Swiss were negotiating payment agreements for Dawes and Young bonds, agreements that were signed by mid-October. British bondholders and the press, namely the Financial Times on 10 October, strongly opposed what they saw as discrimination against British bondholders and called for an official protest. The Foreign Office complied and protested, albeit in a weak form intended only for publicity purposes.

By January 1934, the balance in trade in favour of Germany was beginning to reverse, making a clearing house a feasible retaliatory instrument again. On 25 January a plan was drawn up. The approach raised alarm among London's banking circles, as it risked German retaliation in the form of a moratorium on all British financial claims and thus a disruption of normal trade and credit channels with Germany. However, the threat of a unilateral clearing arrangement prompted German authorities to agree to a settlement on British terms at the end of January 1934.

=== Renewed concerns (June–July 1934) ===
In June 1934, these concerns resurfaced, as Germany appeared on the brink of defaulting on its long-term debts. On 14 June, the Reichsbank announced it would stop paying interest to creditors in foreign currencies from 1 July onwards, prompting the British to again threaten to establish a clearing house.

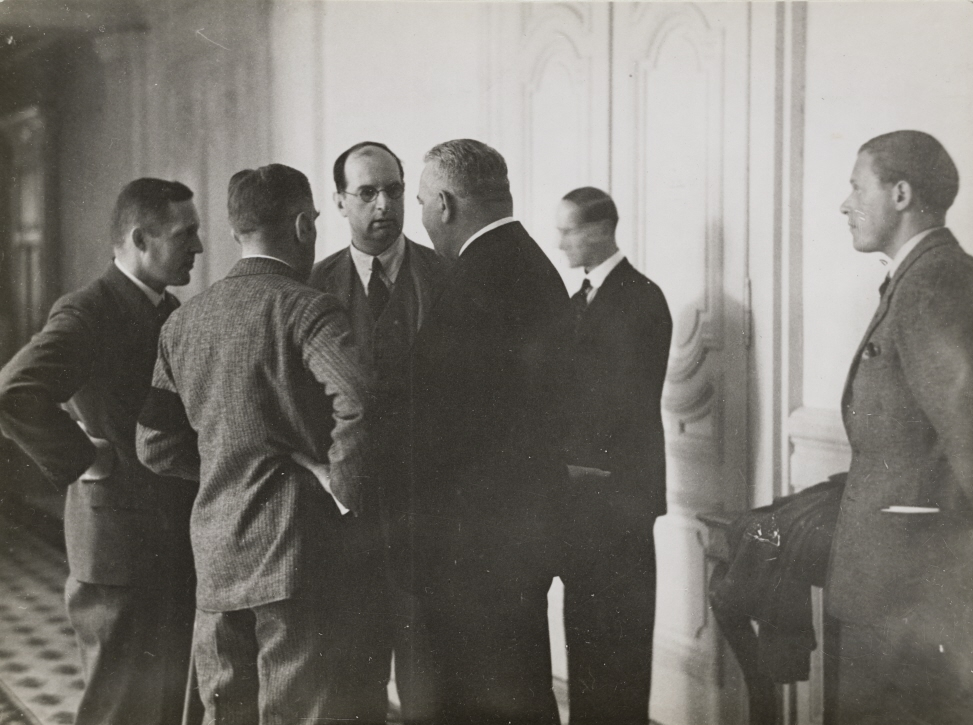
Chief British negotiator Sir Frederick Leith-Ross (third from left, glasses) at the Lausanne Conference in July 1932

These renewed concerns led to the establishment of a financial mission from Berlin to London in late June, headed by diplomat Geheimrat Ulrich, with Britain represented by economist Sir Frederick Leith-Ross. Seeking to gain leverage, the British Parliament passed the Debts Clearing Offices and Imports Restrictions Bill to prepare a clearing house, which was rushed through Parliament in 48 hours on 25–26 June and assented to on 28 June.

By 4 June, the threat of a clearing house had pushed the German negotiators to accept a preliminary Anglo-German Transfer Agreement, by which Germany would continue to service the Dawes and Young loans, and commit to further negotiations on an exchange agreement on commercial payments. Germany promised to end discrimination of creditors and purchase bond coupons in sterling (i.e. continue interest repayments), with the agreement lasting six months from 1 July onwards.

=== Further negotiations (August–November 1934) ===
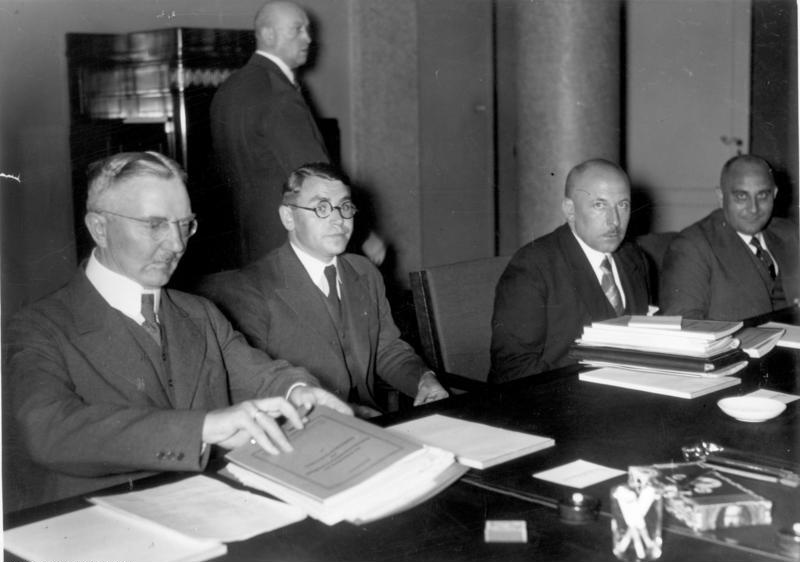
Reichsbank President Hjalmar Schacht (left) at the June-July 1934 Transfer Agreement negotiations

Further negotiations in Berlin on a more extensive agreement, led by Leith-Ross, continued into August 1934. On 10 August, an Exchange Agreement was agreed to in Berlin, ensuring British exporters would receive payments despite Germany's foreign exchange restrictions. This agreement permitted German importers of British goods, who had exhausted their foreign exchange quotas, to pay the cost of imports into a special account at the Reichsbank, in Reichsmarks (up to a limit of 5 million ℛ︁ℳ︁). The Bank of England could then use this account to make payments for goods exported from Germany.

This agreement, voluntary in nature, failed not long after due to Germany announcing a new economic plan, and was suspended on 10 September. Leith-Ross was subsequently sent back to Berlin on 17 September, together with a delegation from the Treasury, the Board of Trade, and representatives of British banking creditors.

The negotiations mainly consisted of proposals for the operation of the clearing house, taking place in the background of private discussions on an alternative plan between Leith-Ross, Schacht and Ulrich. These private discussions led to a breakthrough in negotiations in late October 1934, and the Payments Agreement was announced to the public on 2 November, having been signed the day before.

== Terms ==
The agreement stipulated several key terms:

- The German government would continue to provide sterling funds at the Bank of England for the purchase of all coupons under the Dawes and Young loans at their full value, thus continuing Germany's interest payments on bonds issued under the Dawes and Young agreements (Article 7.i). Germany would also allow for the redemption of all medium and long-term debts against 4% funding bonds (Article 7.ii). This agreement gave UK residents and subjects of the British Empire preferential coupon payments.
- Germany committed to earmarking a percentage of its export earnings in England for the purchase of British commodities (Article 1.ii). Initially set at 55%, this percentage was effectively increased to 60% in 1938 following the change to a sliding scale system.
- Germany committed £400,000 towards paying outstanding debts (Article 4), defined as debts towards UK persons or corporations "in respect of the sale of goods". Germany would also allocate 10% of its export earnings to pay back these debts, if not already liquidated by the lump sum, a provision in effect until 1 November 1935 (Article 6).
- Foreign exchange certificates would be issued by the German government for imports from Britain, up to 55% of the sterling proceeds from German exports to Britain, without restrictions (Article 1.i). These certificates were calculated monthly based on the export value of the penultimate month.
- Goods imported from Britain had to carry a certificate of British origin from the British Chambers of Commerce to prevent the circumvention of trade restrictions (Article 1.iv).

== Revision in 1938 ==
By 1936, with Hitler increasing German rearmament and marching into the Rhineland on 7 March, the agreement was being questioned in papers such as the Financial News. By 1938, with Hitler's annexation of Austria into Germany, these concerns escalated into a crisis, with Britain being forced to seek a revision of the agreement's terms or dissolve it. The economic basis of this potential breakdown of the agreement surrounded the question of Germany honouring the terms of loans given to Austria following World War I.

As negotiations in Berlin for a resettlement began in late May 1938, Germany explicitly refused to honour these Austrian loans, causing Britain (through Leith-Ross) to threaten to end the agreement altogether within a months time. In response, Germany capitulated and counter-offered: a reduction on the Dawes and Young interest rates in return for Germany paying the Austrian loans' interest in full. However, the inclusion of a demand that Britain commit to take in more German exports again moved the British to threaten the use of a unilateral clearing, as in 1934. On 14 June, Britain publicly threatened to end the agreement, giving a deadline of 1 July.

Following a German delegation to London, on 1 July, a revised agreement was reached. Germany would continue to pay interest on Austrian loans, and the clause regarding British exports was amended to a sliding scale, with a new provision that Germany could request a reduction of this allocation if its earnings from British exports were not sufficient to cover it. This new arrangement effectively increased the 55% figure agreed to in 1934 to 60%, notwithstanding an increase in exports resulting from the Austrian annexation. German demands for a reduction in interest rates were also met: on the Dawes and the Austrian loan of 1930, a reduction from 7% to 5%, with a 2% cumulative sinking fund—on the Young loan, a reduction to 4.5%, with a 1% cumulative sinking fund.

== Impact ==
The agreement is generally viewed as having steadied and formalised foreign relations between the two countries throughout the interbellum, providing a significant framework for economic relations until 1939. Author Bernd-Jürgen Wendt writes that the agreement had "generally accepted stabilising effects on bilateral relations, an effect which even the political crises of the subsequent years could not impair. Thus in July 1938 with the Sudeten crisis heading towards its climax, von Dirksen, the German Ambassador to London, explicitly referred to the 1934 Economic Agreement and the 1935 Naval Convention as the 'two main supports which had hitherto carried the swaying structure of foreign relations [between Britain and Germany] even in critical periods'."

Chief negotiator Leith-Ross similarly viewed it as successful, writing in 1968 that "it worked so well that it was renewed, without alteration [excluding 1938], from year to year until the outbreak of war in 1939 [...] within eighteen months all the outstanding arrears of commercial debts had been cleared off and the trade between the two countries had steadily increased. So, in the end, the agreement turned out very satisfactorily for both parties."

Germany continued to pay interest on Dawes and Young bonds to British and French holders until September 1939, when World War II began. Payments to Dutch and Belgian holders were suspended in 1940, to US bondholders in 1941, and to Italian bondholders in 1942. These suspensions of payments was against the provisions of the Dawes and Young plans, which still required payment in times of war and to hostile states. The bonds also continued to be traded on the London Stock Exchange until the end of the war in 1945.

=== Appeasement ===
The agreement (and particularly its 1938 revision) have been seen as being part of Britain's policy of appeasement towards Nazi Germany. Following the 1938 negotiations, British diplomat Frank Ashton-Gwatkin (and by extension the Foreign Office) argued that the revised agreement and, any further trade talks stemming from it, would "strengthen the peace party" and be "a great advance towards economic appeasement". This was also noted by Robert Hudson, the Secretary for Overseas Trade, who stated that any further talks "would have great possibilities as a stepping stone to political appeasement".

In addition to guaranteeing debt repayment, the Treasury and Bank of England saw the agreement as an instrument to widen and revive Germany's foreign trade internationally, with the terms of the 1938 revision in particular fulfilling a British desire to raise the purchasing power of producers in favour of British exports, helping Britain's economic recovery from the Great Depression.

The agreement was beneficial for the Nazi war economy—author Alexander Anievas writes that the agreement allowed Germany to "collect a considerable sum of earnings from the maintenance of its export surplus with Britain. This provided the Nazis with vital financial means to purchase those raw materials Germany needed for her war economy, either through English transit trade or directly on the world market [...] The Payments Agreement was thus designed to ultimately strengthen the Nazi regime from internal socio-economic shocks while protecting Britain's socio-economic interests."

Similarly, Zara Steiner writes that "the implementation of the Payments Agreements was undoubtedly providing the credits and the raw materials—coal, steel, scrap-iron, copper—needed for Germany’s war industries." This view was echoed at the time by British diplomat John Hall Magowan, who served as a commercial counsellor in Berlin from 1937 to 1939. Before and after the September 1938 Munich Agreement, Magowan argued that an amendment enabling Germany to obtain more foreign currency would facilitate its purchase of raw materials for rearmament. Given what he perceived as a practical state of war between Britain and Germany, he insisted that security concerns take priority over commercial interests in economic dealings with Berlin, although these views were not well received in the British government.

== See also ==
- Germany–United Kingdom relations
- Timeline of British diplomatic history
