= Treasury view =

In macroeconomics, particularly in the history of economic thought, the Treasury view is the assertion that fiscal policy has no effect on the total amount of economic activity and unemployment, even during times of economic recession. This view was most famously advanced in the 1930s (during the Great Depression) by the staff of the British Chancellor of the Exchequer. The position can be characterized as:

Any increase in government spending necessarily crowds out an equal amount of private spending or investment, and thus has no net impact on economic activity.

In his 1929 budget speech, Winston Churchill explained, "The orthodox Treasury view ... is that when the Government borrow[s] in the money market it becomes a new competitor with industry and engrosses to itself resources which would otherwise have been employed by private enterprise, and in the process raises the rent of money to all who have need of it."

Keynesian economists reject this view, and often use the term "Treasury view" when criticizing this and related arguments. The term is sometimes conflated with the related position that fiscal stimulus has negligible impact on economic activity, a view that is not incompatible with mainstream macroeconomic theory.

== History ==
In the late 1920s and early 1930s, during the height of the Great Depression, many economists (most prominently John Maynard Keynes) tried to persuade governments that increased government spending would mitigate the situation and reduce unemployment. In the United Kingdom, the staff of the Chancellor of the Exchequer, notably Ralph George Hawtrey and Frederick Leith-Ross, argued against increased spending by putting forward the "Treasury view". Simply put the Treasury view was the view that fiscal policy could only move resources from one use to another, and would not affect the total flow of economic activity. Therefore, neither government spending nor tax cuts could boost employment and economic activity. This view can historically be traced back to various statements of Say's law.

Keynes argued against this position, and particularly in The General Theory of Employment, Interest and Money, provided a theoretical foundation for how fiscal stimulus can increase economic activity during recessions.

Opinions are currently sharply divided on the Treasury view, with different schools of economic thought holding contradicting views. Many in the "freshwater" Chicago school of economics advocate a form of the Treasury view, whereas economists from saltwater schools reject the view as incorrect.

A number of prominent financial economists (including Eugene Fama) have recently advocated the strong form of this view – that of no possible impact. However, it is categorically rejected by Keynesian macroeconomics, which holds that economic activity depends on aggregate spending (at least in the short run). It is related to, and at times equated with, theories of Say's law, Ricardian equivalence, and the Policy Ineffectiveness Proposition.

Noted macroeconomists such as Milton Friedman and Robert Barro have advocated a weak form of this view, that fiscal policy has temporary and limited effects.

== Arguments for ==
Arguments equivalent to the Treasury view are frequently rediscovered independently, and are often in turn criticized by Keynesian macroeconomists.

=== Accounting ===
One line of argument is to use the accounting equations in the National Income and Product Accounts (NIPA) to say that, as a matter of accounting, government spending must come from somewhere, and thus has no net impact on aggregate demand, unemployment, or income.

Positions on this argument are far apart: advocates of the accounting argument for the Treasury view argue that as a matter of accounting (by definition) fiscal stimulus cannot have an economic impact, while critics argue that this argument is fundamentally wrong-headed and mistaken.

A Keynesian reply, by Paul Krugman, is that

...[this] commits one of the most basic fallacies in economics — interpreting an accounting identity as a behavioral relationship.

That is, NIPA accounting equations hold for a fixed GDP: the point of fiscal stimulus is to change GDP, and that changes in government spending are only exactly offset by decreases in other spending or investment if GDP is unchanged. Keynesians argue that fiscal stimulus can increase GDP, thus making this point moot.

Another Keynesian reply, by Brad DeLong, is that these make assumptions about saving and investment, and ignore basic monetary economics, notably velocity of money: if (for a given money supply) velocity of money increases, (nominal) GDP increases, as GDP = Money Supply * Velocity of Money: a dollar of government spending need not crowd out a dollar of private spending, either as an accounting matter or as a behavioral matter, as it may increase velocity of money.

=== Economic model ===
An argument advanced by Milton Friedman in the converse context (fiscal restraint via tax increases having a braking effect, as opposed to fiscal stimulus having a stimulating effect) begins with the NIPA argument above, then continues from the accounting to an economic model:

To find any net effect on private spending, one must look farther beneath the surface.

specifically:

[S]ome of the funds not borrowed by the Federal government may be added to idle cash balances rather than spent or loaned.
In addition, it takes time for borrowers and lenders to adjust to reduced government borrowing.

concluding:

However, any net decrease in spending from these sources is certain to be temporary and likely to be minor.

and instead advocating monetary policy as the bottom line:

To have a significant impact on the economy, a tax increase must somehow affect monetary policy–the quantity of money and its rate of growth.

This analysis, while disputed by Keynesians (who argue that the effects of fiscal stimulus are more significant than Friedman argues), is considered a legitimate approach, and not dismissed out of hand as wrong-headed.
