= Crowding out (economics) =

Reduction in private investment caused by increased government borrowing

In economics, crowding out is a phenomenon that occurs when increased government involvement in a sector of the market economy substantially affects the remainder of the market, either on the supply or demand side of the market.

The most common example of the crowding out effect is when expansionary fiscal policy (involving deficit spending) reduces investment spending by the private sector. Essentially, an increase in government spending "crowds out" private investment, as the government's heightened need to compete with the private stock and bond market for loanable/investable funds requires it to offer higher interest rates to obtain the additional funds. The private market looks less attractive by comparison, and thus the government (seen as substitute by investors) draws funds away from private-sector investment. This basic analysis has been broadened to multiple channels that might leave total output little changed or even smaller.

Other economists use "crowding out" to refer to government providing a service or good that would otherwise be a business opportunity for private industry, and be subject only to the economic forces seen in voluntary exchange.

Behavioral economists and other social scientists also use "crowding out" to describe a downside of solutions based on private exchange: the crowding out of intrinsic motivation and prosocial norms in response to the financial incentives of voluntary market exchange.

== History ==
The idea of the crowding out effect, though not the term itself, has been discussed since at least the 18th century. Economic historian Jim Tomlinson wrote in 2010: "All major economic crises in twentieth century Britain have reignited simmering debates about the impact of public sector expansion on economic performance. From the 'Geddes Axe' after the First World War, through John Maynard Keynes' attack on the 'Treasury view' in the interwar years, down to the 'monetarist' assaults on the public sector of the 1970s and 1980s, it has been alleged that public sector growth in itself, but especially if funded by state borrowing, has detrimental effects on the national economy." Much of the debate in the 1970s was based on the assumption of a fixed supply of savings within a single country, but with the global capital markets of the 21st century "...international capital mobility completely undermines a simple model of crowding out".

== Crowding out from government borrowing ==
One channel of crowding out is a reduction in private investment and accumulation of real resources that occurs because of an increase in government spending. Increased government spending results in a shift in the distribution of real resources produced within an economy, away from private use and to public use. This "crowding out" of real investment of capital stock and other resources reduces what is available to the private sector. However, this is assuming that the resource acquisition for the public purpose is non-productive in the long run. There is some controversy in modern macroeconomics on the subject, as different schools of economic thought differ on how households and financial markets would react to more government borrowing under various circumstances.

The extent to which resource crowding out occurs depends on the economic situation. If the economy is at capacity or full employment, then the government suddenly increasing its budget deficit (e.g., via stimulus programs) could create competition with the private sector for scarce resources, resulting in a redistribution of production across the economy. Thus the effect of the stimulus is offset by the effect of crowding out. On the other hand, if the economy is below capacity and there is a surplus of resources available, an increase in the government's deficit does not result in competition with the private sector. In this scenario, the stimulus program would be much more effective. In summary, changing the government's budget deficit has a stronger impact on GDP when the economy is below capacity. In the aftermath of the 2008 subprime mortgage crisis, the U.S. economy remained well below capacity and there was a large headroom of potential production available should investment be made, so increasing the budget deficit put funds to use that would otherwise have been idle.

The IS curve moves to the right, causing higher interest rates (i) and expansion in the "real" economy (real GDP, or Y).

=== What factors determine how much crowding out takes place? ===
The extent to which interest rate adjustments dampen the output expansion induced by increased government spending is determined by:

- Income increases more than interest rates increase if the LM (Liquidity preference—Money supply) curve is flatter.
- Income increases less than interest rates increase if the IS (Investment—Saving) curve is flatter.
- Income and interest rates increase more the larger the multiplier, thus, the larger the horizontal shift in the IS curve.

In each case, the extent of crowding out is greater the more interest rate increases when government spending rises.

Economist Laura D'Andrea Tyson wrote in June 2012: "By itself an increase in the deficit, either in the form of an increase in government spending or a reduction in taxes, causes an increase in demand. But how this affects output, employment and growth depends on what happens to interest rates. When the economy is operating near capacity, government borrowing to finance an increase in the deficit causes interest rates to fall in the first instance since higher net spending from the government injects liquidity into the banking system, pushing down the overnight rate. A response from the Central Bank to increase interest rates may occur if they believe the increased government spending at full resource employment would be inflationary. Higher interest rates reduce private investment, and this reduces growth. The resource “crowding out” argument purports to explain why large and sustained government deficits can take a toll on growth; they reduce capital formation in the private sector. But this argument rests on how government deficits are used. Increased net spending on highly productive state investment in physical and human infrastructure will likely increase long-run growth due to an expansion in the productive potential of the population. When there is considerable excess capacity within the economy, an increase in government deficit does not crowd out private real capital formation. Instead, the higher demand resulting from the increase in the deficit bolsters employment and output directly, and the resulting increase in income and economic activity in turn encourages or 'crowds in' additional private spending. The crowding-in argument is the right one for current economic conditions."

=== Two extreme cases ===
==== Liquidity trap ====
If the economy is in a hypothesized liquidity trap, the "Liquidity-Money" (LM) curve is horizontal, an increase in government spending has its full multiplier effect on the equilibrium income. There is no change in the interest associated with the change in government spending, thus no investment spending cut off. Therefore, there is no dampening of the effects of increased government spending on income. If the demand for money is very sensitive to interest rates, so that the LM curve is almost horizontal, fiscal policy changes have a relatively large effect on output, while monetary policy changes have little effect on the equilibrium output. So, if the LM curve is horizontal, monetary policy has no impact on the equilibrium of the economy and the fiscal policy has a maximal effect.

==== The classical case and crowding out ====
If the LM curve is vertical, then an increase in government spending has no effect on the equilibrium income and only increases the interest rates. If the demand for money is not related to the interest rate, as the vertical LM curve implies, then there is a unique level of income at which the money market is in equilibrium.

Thus, with a vertical LM curve, an increase in government spending cannot change the equilibrium income and only raises the equilibrium interest rates. But if government spending is higher and the output is unchanged, there must be an offsetting reduction in private spending. In this case, the increase in interest rates crowds out an amount of private spending equal to increase in government spending. Thus, there is full crowding out if LM is vertical.

== Crowding out sources ==
If increased government net spending with a corresponding increased issuance of government bonds leads to the Central Bank increasing interest rates, and hence a higher "price" (ceteris paribus), the private sector, which is sensitive to interest rates, will likely reduce investment due to a lower rate of return. This is the investment that is crowded out. The weakening of fixed investment and other interest-sensitive expenditure counteracts to varying extents the expansionary effect of government deficits. More importantly, a fall in fixed investment by business can hurt long-term economic growth of the supply side, i.e., the growth of potential output. Thus, the situation in which a tight monetary policy may lead to crowding out is that companies would like to expand productive capacity, but, because of high interest rates, cannot borrow funds with which to do so. According to American economist Jared Bernstein, writing in 2011, this scenario is "not a plausible story with excess capacity, the Fed funds [interest] rate at zero, and companies sitting on cash that they could invest with if they saw good reasons to do so." Another American economist, Paul Krugman, pointed out that, after the beginning of the recession in 2008, the federal government's borrowing increased by hundreds of billions of dollars, leading to warnings about crowding out, but instead interest rates had actually fallen. When aggregate demand is low, government spending tends to expand the market for private-sector products through the fiscal multiplier and thus stimulates – or "crowds in" – fixed investment (via the "accelerator effect"). This accelerator effect is most important when business suffers from unused industrial capacity, i.e., during a serious recession or a depression.

Chartalist and Post-Keynesian economists question the crowding out of nominal funds thesis because government spending has the actual effect of lowering short-term interest rates by injecting liquidity into the banking system in the first instance, not raising them. However, the rate for short-term debt is always set by intervention by central banks - they pay interest on reserve balances to set a floor on inter-bank lending rates and therefore bank-customer lending rates. Additionally, private credit is not constrained by any "amount of funds" or "money supply" or similar concept. Rather, banks lend to any credit-worthy customer, constrained by their capitalization level and risk regulations. The resulting loan creates a deposit simultaneously, increasing the amount of endogenous money at that time. Crowding out is most plausibly effective when an economy is already at potential output or full employment. Then the government's expansionary fiscal policy encourages increased prices, which lead to an increased demand for money. This in turn leads to higher interest rates if the Central Bank decides to increase them and crowds out interest-sensitive spending. At potential output, businesses are in no need of markets, so that there is no room for an accelerator effect. More directly, if the economy stays at full employment gross domestic product, any increase in government purchases shifts resources away from the private sector. This phenomenon is sometimes called "real" crowding out and is the only pertinent crowding out that occurs with increased government spending.

Crowding out of another sort (often referred to as international crowding out) may occur due to the prevalence of floating exchange rates, as demonstrated by the Mundell–Fleming model. Government borrowing can lead to higher interest rates if the Central Bank raises them, which attract inflows of money on the capital account from foreign financial markets into the domestic currency (i.e., into assets denominated in that currency). Under floating exchange rates, that leads to appreciation of the exchange rate and thus the "crowding out" of domestic exports (which become more expensive to those using foreign currency). However, an appreciating domestic currency increases domestic demand for imports thereby "crowding in" the import of real production produced abroad. These effects on net exports have ambiguous impacts on the demand-promoting effects of government deficits but have no obvious negative effect on long-term economic growth.

== Crowding out demand ==
In terms of health economics, "crowding-out" refers to the phenomenon whereby new or expanded programs meant to cover the uninsured have the effect of prompting those already enrolled in private insurance to switch to the new program. This effect was seen, for example, in expansions to Medicaid and the State Children's Health Insurance Program (SCHIP) in the late 1990s.

Therefore, high takeup rates for new or expanded programs do not merely represent the previously uninsured, but also represent those who may have been forced to shift their health insurance from the private to the public sector. As a result of these shifts, it can be projected that healthcare improvements as a result of policy change may not be as robust. In the context of the CHIP debate, this assumption was challenged by projections produced by the Congressional Budget Office, which "scored" all versions of the CHIP reauthorization and included in those scores the best assumptions available regarding the impacts of increased funding for these programs. CBO assumed that many already eligible children would become enrolled as a result of the new funding and policies in CHIP reauthorization, but that some would be eligible for private insurance. The vast majority, even in states with enrollments of those above twice the poverty line (around $40,000 for a family of four), did not have access to age-appropriate health insurance for their children. New Jersey, supposedly the model for profligacy in SCHIP with eligibility that stretched to 350% of the federal poverty level, testified that it could identify 14% crowd-out in its CHIP program.

In the context of CHIP and Medicaid, many children are eligible but not enrolled. Thus, in comparison to Medicare, which allows for near "auto-enrollment" for those over 64, children's caregivers may be required to fill out 17-page forms, produce multiple consecutive pay stubs, re-apply at more than yearly intervals and even conduct face-to-face interviews to prove the eligibility of the child. These anti-crowd-out procedures can fracture care for children, sever the connection to their medical home and lead to worse health outcomes.

== Crowding out supply ==
Crowding out is also said to occur in charitable giving when government public policy inserts itself into roles that had traditionally been private voluntary charity, rendering private charity unnecessary. Crowding out has also been observed in the area of venture capital, suggesting that government involvement in financing commercial enterprises crowds out private finance.
