= Francesco Giavazzi =

Italian economist (born 1949)

- Born: August 11, 1949 (age 77); Bergamo, Italy

Academic background
- Education: Politecnico di Milano, MIT (PhD)
- Doctoral advisor: Rudi Dornbusch

Francesco Giavazzi (born 11 August 1949) is an Italian economist. He is Professor of Economics at Bocconi University and a regular visiting professor at MIT.

== Life and career ==
Born in Bergamo, Giavazzi graduated in electrical engineering from the Politecnico di Milano university in 1972 and obtained a PhD in economics from Massachusetts Institute of Technology in 1978 under the supervision of Rudi Dornbusch. In addition to being a professor at Bocconi University in Milan, he is a Research Fellow and a Trustee of Centre for Economic Policy Research (CEPR), a member of the Strategic Committee of Agence France Trésor, and of the Group of Economic Policy Advisers to the President of the European Commission, José Manuel Barroso. During 2004, he was the Houblon-Norman Fellow at the Bank of England. During the D'Alema government (1998–2000) he was a member of the Council of Economic Advisers to the Italian prime minister. He was Director General of the Italian Treasury responsible for debt management and privatizations from 1992 to 1994.

From 1991 to 1999, Giavazzi was an editor of the European Economic Review. He is also well known for his editorials in Italy's leading daily Corriere della Sera. He contributes to the economics web sites Voxeu.org and LaVoce.info. In 2015, Giavazzi wrote a scathing denunciation of Greeks. His polemic was criticized by Karl Whelan, a professor of economics at University College Dublin.
