= Monetary/fiscal debate =

The monetary/fiscal policy debate, otherwise known as the Ando–Modigliani/Friedman–Meiselman debate (or AM/FM debate from the main instigators' initials, and for this reason sometimes jokingly called the "radio stations debate" (Note: See AM Broadcasting and FM Broadcasting)), was the exchange of viewpoints about the comparative efficiency of monetary policies and fiscal policies that originated with a work co-authored by Milton Friedman and David I. Meiselman and first published in 1963, as part of studies submitted to the Commission on Money and Credit.

Surveys of American Economic Association (AEA) members since the 1970s have shown that professional economists generally agree with the statement: "Fiscal policy has a significant stimulative impact on a less than fully employed economy." Conversely, while a 2000 survey of AEA members found that while 72 percent generally agreed with the statement that "Management of the business cycle should be left to the Federal Reserve; activist fiscal policy should be avoided", surveys from 2011 and 2021 found 56 percent and 67 percent disagreed respectively.

== Origin ==
In the early 1960s, contributing to the studies invited by the Commission on Money and Credit, Milton Friedman and David Meiselman published a study whereby, they found that "[e]xcept for the early years of the Great Depression, money is more closely related to consumption than is autonomous expenditures," (Note: The term "autonomous expenditures" denotes the components of an economy's aggregate expenditure that are not affected by that same economy's real level of income. E.g. government spending, basic living expenses, and private investing. See Friedman/Meiselman (1963)) claiming moreover that "[t]he results [of the tests] are strikingly one-sided". They used the following reduced form, least squares regression equation to compare the effectiveness of monetary and fiscal policies; in effect, to compare Keynesian and monetarist theories:

$C_t = \alpha + VM_t + KA_t$ (1)

where C is induced private consumption, α is a constant, V represents money velocity, M is approximately M2, K represents an expenditure-multiplier, A is autonomous expenditures, and t represents time. Friedman and Meiselman found that, whether using annual data from 1897 to 1958 or quarterly data from 1946 to 1958, and whether using only real, contemporaneous data, or experimenting with various time lags, private consumption was not statistically significantly affected by discretionary fiscal policy, but was by monetary policy. They stated that their monetary variables were "highly correlated" with consumption, whereas fiscal policy variables were not.

== Debate ==
The Friedman/Meiselman 1963 paper was addressed with numerous articles, where counter-arguments were made: The model was erroneously specified because important and statistically relevant variables were omitted; the data used were not actually coincident with the theory behind them; there was no correction for the "thermostat effect" (Note: The "thermostat effect" denotes the occasion when discretionary fiscal policy is used because spending and output are down, just as a thermostat senses the house temperature and raises the heat so that the temperature is maintained at the desired level. See Bias (2014)) so that even if fiscal policy is effective it will seem to have a neutral or even negative relationship with spending rather than the positive effect it is theorized to have; and that the results were time-specific.

=== Hester claims bias ===
In 1964, Donald D. Hester criticized the F/M paper for "bias" against a "Keynesian" outcome. For that purpose, Hester argued that government deficits are endogenously determined, and not exogenously, and thus no single-equation approach could properly capture government spending and deficits, while the same principle applies for short-run private investment. Also, Hester emphasized that the actual data should have been empirically tested in first-differential form so as to extricate the trends of both explanatory variables, and thus demonstrate only the endogenously generated economic growth. Hester stated that, when he tried "improved" data and empirical methods, “the autonomous expenditure theory outperformed the quantity theory [of money],” i.e. Keynesian economics win over monetarist economics.

=== Friedman/Meiselman respond ===
In a paper published in 1964, Friedman and Meiselman conceded that Hester’s suggestion of using first differences was correct and that it is a better method for their single-equation approach. But they insisted that their interpretations of income and autonomous expenditures are relevant, rejecting Hester’s misgivings. They claimed that Hester’s use of correlation coefficients with his newly defined autonomous expenditures constituted an "unsound argument,"and summarized as follows:

We remain of the opinion that there is a striking division among students of economic affairs about the role of money in determining the course of economic events. One view is that the quantity of money matters little; the other, that it is a key factor in understanding, and even more, controlling economic change. Our paper tried to present some evidence relevant to deciding between these views. The kind of evidence we gave is not the only kind that is relevant and may not be the most important or significant. And, of course, much other evidence is available from other work by us and by many others. This other evidence needs to be added to and brought to bear on the main issue that divides economists into two groups. Hester does not quarrel with the relevance of our evidence but with the particular form of the income-expenditure theory we use. [Hester's] criticism of our procedure rests primarily on a misunderstanding of the theoretical basis of our approach. He offers neither theoretical argument nor empirical evidence in support of his alternative formulation. Hence his criticism is largely beside the point. That is unfortunate. We badly need work on these problems that will clarify the issues involved. We can ill afford to waste the energy, interest, and ability that Hester displays in his paper on frivolous quibbling.

=== Ando and Modigliani: both policies affect outcome ===
Albert Ando and Franco Modigliani, in a paper published in 1965, disputed the findings presented in the 1963 Friedman/Meiselman work. Ando and Modigliani claimed that

[The Friedman/Meiselman 1963 work] has shortcomings in procedures that if repaired change the result, but, moreover, the single-equation approach coupled with the equally single, independent variable approach and the corresponding correlations cannot shed light on macro-policy.

They argued that the consumption function (Note: Friedman, in 1957, had written on the subject of the consumption function a book (Friedman (1957)) that he later stated he considered his "most important professional contribution". See Taylor (2001)) was not correctly specified within the F/M use of autonomous expenditures and claimed that the variable that Friedman and Meiselman had derived was actually saving and not autonomous expenditures. They also observed that the data used in the 1963 paper would need to be modified by including corporate retained earnings, transfer payments made by the government to foreigners, and “wage accruals over disbursement.”

Ando and Modigliani objected to the use of an ordinary, least squares equation because of the induced influence on the independent variable by the dependent variable (Note: Meaning that the independent variable is not really independent) and offered their own model, which ostensibly removed the independent part from the induced part.

Ando and Modigliani criticized the Friedman/Meiselman paper for omitting to determine exogenous and endogenous components to monetary policy in the same manner as economists do with fiscal policy. Instead, Ando and Modigliani, rather than using a standard money-supply variable, introduced M*, which is meant to represent what the money stock would be if high powered money were "fully utilized", thus introducing a "high-usage variable." (Note: This is somewhat akin to a high-employment fiscal variable. See Bias (2014)) The purpose was to show that money is not exogenously determined: people can choose to hold money in different amounts and levels of liquidity as situations warrant, while lenders don't need to lend out all of their excess reserves if they so desire - which constitutes a standard Keynesian concept. Moreover, Ando and Modigliani found that the error variance in predicting output (Note: "NNP" in the paper, i.e. Net National Product) was "much higher" when using money than any of the fiscal variables and labeled the F & M respective results "spurious."

They concluded that Friedman and Meiselman’s results were biased in favor of monetary policy, and that, if both policy variables were to be given a balanced approach, the end result would be that both policies would have real and statistically significant effects on the economy. Indeed, in the opening statement of their paper, they state that the "number of basic shortcomings in [the Friedman/Meiselman] procedure...make the results of their elaborate battery of tests essentially worthless." Economists Michael DePrano and Thomas Mayer published a critique of the F & M paper that was generally in line with the criticisms leveled by A & M.

=== FM respond to AM ===
In 1965, Friedman and Mieselman responded to the criticism leveled at their 1963 paper, particularly by Ando and Modigliani. They claimed that although one could indeed object to their autonomous-expenditure variable, any of the alternatives that had been put forward by others were equally objectionable. Additionally, Friedman and Meiselman defended their use of their consumption function and explained why it is, in their view, the right method to use. And they pointed out that, unlike them, Ando and Modigliani used nominal data rather than real data and, therefore, the empirical results put forward by A & M could not be correctly comparable to their own.

Friedman and Mieselman agreed in theory with A & M that the term M* is a valid means to determine the exogenous versus the endogenous nature of the policy variable but still disagreed with the actual A & M methodology to determine M*. As to the consumption variance, they maintained that "of the total variance of consumption for the 25 years, 88 per cent is accounted for by the differences between the means for the two subperiods."

Finally, they claimed complete lack of bias in their research and the empirical processes and claimed that even if they had built a model that seemed to favor monetary policy over fiscal policy, that was because the theory comes out that way. They concluded as follows:

None of the calculations made by our critics for supposedly the same purpose is correct because they omit some components of income for the income-expenditure calculations, set the two theories different tasks, or use lengthy periods combining two different sub-periods. We have made some of the correct calculations for one of the alternative concepts of autonomous expenditures (Ando and Modigliani’s). Though less clear-cut, the results are in the same direction as those from our original calculations. Hence, we are left with no reason to change our earlier conclusion that “so far as these data go [and, we may now add, those adduced by Ando and Modigliani, DePrano and Mayer, and Hester] (Note: Text inside brackets in the original) the widespread belief that the investment multiplier is stabler than the monetary velocity is an invalid generalization from the experience of three or four years. It holds for neither later nor earlier years”.

=== The St. Louis equation ===
In 1968, Federal Reserve Bank of St. Louis economists Leonall C. Andersen and Jerry L. Jordan published a study that fully supported the Friedman and Meiselman single-equation approach but expanded it in response to the criticisms of the 1963 paper. They offered their own economic output model, in which all variables are in first-differential form as denoted by ∆, as follows:

$\Delta Y_t=\alpha + \sum_{i=0}^{4}m_i\Delta M_{{t-1}} + \sum_{i=0}^{4}e_i\Delta E_{{t-1}} + \sum_{i=0}^{4}z_i\Delta Z_{{t-1}}$ (2)

where α is a constant; Y is nominal domestic spending; M represents monetary policy defined by the monetary base; E represents variously high-employment expenditures, high-employment receipts, or high-employment surplus; and Z represents a catch-all variable defined as “a variable summarizing all other forces that influence total spending.” Those forces include weather, international trade, preferences, technology, resources, infrastructure, war, etc. In their math, they used an Almon lag technique with 4th-degree polynomials and a 4-period time lag. (Note: As denoted by the figure '4' atop the sum sign $\Sigma$) They concluded that, just as Friedman and Meiselman had found, monetary policy seemed to affect whatever measure was used for spending; but fiscal policy did not.

=== De Leeuw and Kalchbrenner: endogenous vs. exogenous ===
In 1969, Frank DeLeeuw and J. Kalchbrenner, also St. Louis Fed economists, published an article that criticized "severely" the Andersen/Jordan study and modeling. They argued that exogenous fiscal policy cannot be properly measured by using any of the fiscal policy definitions presented by their colleagues, nor can any single-equation approach bring into relief the particular influences of such a policy variable. There exist no ways, they claimed, to separate the endogenous- from the exogenous-policy effects because those effects are effectively lost in the complex workings of an entire economy. They pointed out, in particular, that the tax and monetary-base variables are impossibly entangled with the endogeneity-exogeneity problem and claimed that the Andersen/Jordan method leaves out the influences introduced by inflation.

The main argument by De Leeuw and Kalchbrenne was that causality cannot be demonstrated by the single-equation approach, and the direction of causation is impossible to establish, i.e. GNP could be driving is fiscal spending rather than the other way around. After making a "clear improvement" on the Andersen/Jordan model (using high employment receipts adjusted for inflation as the fiscal variable and two different versions of the monetary base), and re-running the "St. Louis equation" on the basis of data from 1952 to 1968, they proclaimed that, according to their findings, fiscal expenditures were statistically significant, positively correlated (Note: It was commented that, of course, correlation does not necessarily imply causation. E.g. Gramlich (1971)) to changes in GNP in the long run - as was also true for changes in monetary policy.

=== Other arguments ===
In 1971, William L. Silber posited that the researchers were altering their equations to fit into whatever their ideological worldviews were theorizing, which was the reason he gave his paper a "highly political" title. He questioned the validity of the overall methodology behind the "St. Louis equation" approach, after running it in various time periods that were deemed to have the same underlying structural form, and finding that some periods appeared to show fiscal policy as quite significant while others did not.

In 1971, Edward Gramlich reviewed the “radio debate" up to that point and compared the multiplier and elasticity estimates for monetary and fiscal policies among the several different models and the non-single equation models. As he stated, all the models, except the Ando/Modigliani ones, showed monetary policy to have a multiplier above 1, and in every case to be larger than the fiscal multiplier. His study, which included a model "improving" the St Louis equation, supported the view that monetary policy is strongly correlated with spending but also found that fiscal policy is correlated as well.

In 1972, Stephen M. Goldfeld, Alan S. Blinder, John Kareken and William Poole, in their study, criticized the Andersen/Jordan approach as econometrically unsound. They argued that, without a reaction function, one cannot determine the nature of the “exogenous” from the "endogenous”, and that, if the rules or automatic stabilizers are done to counter-cyclical perfection, then the correlations do not show up with the statistical significance we would expect. Their paper concludes that the single-equation approach used to empirically determine the comparative efficiency of monetary and fiscal policies is "without merit."

In 1973, William Poole and Elinda B. F. Kornblith found that all the models tended to "underpredict," and attempted to provide hypotheses for that result. Their conclusion was that the “decision [about which models were correct or supported monetary or fiscal policies] must still be rated a draw.” In 1975, J. W. Elliot conducted an empirical analysis and pointed out the difficulty of comparing the regression coefficients as “multipliers” since their corresponding variables are money, which is a stock, and fiscal spending, which is a flow. He concluded that, irrespective of technique, his results supported the Andersen/Jordan results.

=== Ando and Modigliani return ===
In 1974, at a conference held at Brown University, Ando and Modigliani presented a paper where they recreated an analysis of a simulated economy using the Andersen/Jordan method, which, they concluded, was biased in favor of monetary policy. Their work was published in 1976.

=== Keith Carlson vs. Benjamin Friedman ===
In 1977, Benjamin Friedman found that, using the Andersen/Jordan model but extending the data set out to the 2nd quarter of 1976, fiscal policy was now statistically significant in the determination of expenditures -although serious heteroscedasticity problems had appeared. He also found that, if he used data starting at the 1st quarter of 1960, the results were even more favorable to discretionary fiscal policy, reiterating the existence in the Andersen/Jordan model of an inherent coefficient bias. Ultimately, he concluded that the St Louis equation methodology was "not salvageable."

In response, Keith Carlson, in 1978, made an empirical modification to the original Andersen/Jordan model, whereby instead of using a first-difference approach, he posited that a rate-of-change approach eliminated the heteroscedasticity problems discovered by B. Friedman. Carlson’s model is as follows:

$\dot{Y}_t=\alpha + \sum_{i=0}^{4}m_i \dot{M}_{{t-1}} + \sum_{i=0}^{4}e_i\ \dot{E}_{{t-1}}$ (3)

where the variables are the same as in the Andersen/Jordan model but the dots over the terms denote growth rates for the respective variables. Carlson determined that his model once again supported the original conclusion of significant monetary-policy effects and insignificant fiscal-policy effects.

== Outcome ==
Numerous papers have appeared in the literature, dating from the 1963 original work until the 2010s. In 2011, Stefan Belliveau attempted to sum up the debate down to three “interpretations”: Real business-cycle theory says that neither fiscal nor monetary policy is very effective, essentially rejecting state activism; Keynesian theory suggests that government expenditures can influence economic output while monetary policy is not as effective; and monetarist theory says that monetary policy is effective while fiscal policy is not. To settle the matter, Belliveau attempted to salvage the Andersen/Jordan equation by including Gross Value Added by Sector as his output-dependent variable, considering it necessary to look at these data if policymakers are attempting to stabilize economic fluctuations. Using annual data from 1956 to 2007, Belliveau found empirical support, as claimed, that both monetary and fiscal policy seem to help stabilize an economy, and considers the use of both policies in the United States as being "reasonable" during and after the Great Recession.

Milton Friedman, in a 2000s interview, maintained that "the debate was over" and that "everyone agrees fundamentally" with the notion of monetary-policy supremacy. He stated that he still had "far more extreme views about the unimportance of fiscal policy for the aggregate economy than the [economist] profession does." In 2000, a survey of 298 members of the American Economic Association found that while 84 percent generally agreed with the statement "Fiscal policy has a significant stimulative impact on a less than fully employed economy", 71 percent also generally agreed with the statement "Management of the business cycle should be left to the Federal Reserve; activist fiscal policy should be avoided." In 2011, a follow-up survey of 568 AEA members found that the previous consensus about the latter proposition had dissolved and was by then roughly evenly disputed. Some heterodox economists (most notably Post-Keynesians) reject in their entirety old and new arguments in favor of monetary policy. As observed by Peter Bias (Note: Dept of Business and Economics at Florida Southern College) in a 2014 retrospective of the debate, it all "points to the importance of clearly defining precise, objective functions or theories, and using the appropriate variables and methodologies to empirically test those theories."

== See also ==
- Monetarism
- Keynesianism
- Post-Keynesian economics

== Bibliography ==
- Andersen, Leonall C. & Jerry L Jordan (1968) “Monetary and fiscal actions: a test of their relative importance in economic stabilization”, Federal Reserve Bank of St. Louis Review, 1968, vol.50, pp. 11–24
- Ando, Albert & Franco Modigliani (1965) "The relative stability of monetary velocity and the investment multiplier", The American Economic Review, 55.4, pp. 693–728
- Ando, Albert & Franco Modigliani (1976) "Impacts of fiscal actions on aggregate income and the monetarist controversy: theory and evidence", Monetarism, North-Holland Publishing Company, Amsterdam, 1976, pp. 17–42
- Batten, Dallas S. & Daniel L. Thornton (1986) "The Monetary-Fiscal Policy Debate and the Andersen-Jordan Equation", Federal Reserve Bank of St. Louis, October 1986
- DeLeeuw, Frank & J. Kalchbrenner (1969) "Monetary and Fiscal Actions: A Test of Their Relative Stability—Comment", Federal Reserve Bank of St. Louis Review, 52, April 1969, pp. 6–11
- DePrano, Michael & and Thomas Mayer (1965) "Tests of the Relative Importance of Autonomous Expenditures and Money", The American Economic Review, Vol. 55, No. 4, September 1965, pp. 729–752
- Eisner, Robert & Paul J. Pieper (1988) "Deficits, Monetary Policy, and Real Economic Activity" in The Economics of Public Debt: Proceedings of a Conference held by the International Economic Association at Stanford, California, Kenneth J. Arrow & Michael J. Boskin (editors), Palgrave Macmillan UK, ISBN 978-0-333-46815-9
- Elliot, J. W. (1975) “The Influence of Monetary and Fiscal Actions on Total Spending: The St. Louis Total Spending Equation Revisited”, Journal of Money, Credit and Banking, Vol 7 Number 2, May 1975, pp. 181–192
- Ericsson, Neil R., David F. Hendry, & Stedman B. Hood (2016) "Milton Friedman as an Empirical Modeler"; in Milton Friedman: Contributions to Economics and Public Policy by Robert A. Cord & J. Daniel Hammond (editors), Oxford University Press; 1st edition: 15 August 2016, ISBN 978-0198704324
- Friedman, Benjamin M. (1977) “Even the St. Louis Model now Believes in Fiscal Policy”, Journal of Money, Credit and Banking, May 1977, pp. 365–67
- Friedman, Milton (1957) A Theory of the Consumption Function, Princeton University Press; 1st edition: June 1957; ISBN 978-0691041827
- Friedman, Milton & David I. Meiselman (1963) "The Relative Stability of Monetary Velocity and the Investment Multiplier in the United States, 1897-1958", Stabilization Policies: A Series of Research Studies Prepared for the Commission on Money and Credit by E. C. Brown et al, Englewood Cliffs, NJ: Prentice-Hall: 1963, pp. 165–268
- Friedman, Milton & David I. Meiselman (1964) “Reply to Donald Hester”, Review of Economics and Statistics, 46 (4), pp. 369–76
- Friedman, Milton & David I. Meiselman (1965) "Reply to Ando and Modigliani and to Deprano and Mayer", American Economic Review, 55, September 1965, pp. 753–785
- Gramlich, Edward M. (1971) "The usefulness of monetary and fiscal policy as discretionary stabilization tools", Journal of Money, Credit and Banking, 3.2, pp. 506–532
- Gramlich, Edward M. (2004) "Reflections of a Policy Economist", in Reflections Of Eminent Economists by Michael Szenberg & Lall Ramrattan (editors), Edward Elgar; 4 December 2004, ISBN 978-1843766285
- Hester, Donald D. (1964) “Keynes and the Quantity Theory: A Comment on the Friedman/Meiselman CMC Paper”, Review of Economics and Statistics, Vol. 46, No. 4, November 1964, pp. 364–368
- McCallum, Bennett T. (1985) "Monetary vs. Fiscal Policy Effects: A Review of the Debate", Working Paper No. 1556, National Bureau of Economic Research, February 1985
- Mitchell, William (2016) "The Modigliani controversy: the break with Keynesian thinking", 21 January 2016
- Poole, William & Elinda B. F. Kornblith (1973) “Friedman-Meiselman CMC Paper: New Evidence on an Old Controversy”, The American Economic Review, Vol. 63, No. 5, December 1973, pp. 908–917
- Silber, William L. (1971) “The St. Louis Equation: ‘Democratic’ and ‘Republican’ Version and other experiments”, The Review of Economics and Statistics, Vol. 53, No. 4, (November 1971), pp. 362–367
- Taylor, John B. (2001) "An Interview with Milton Friedman", in Inside the Economist's Mind: Conversations with Eminent Economists, William A. Barnett & Paul Samuelson (editors), Wiley-Blackwell, 1st edition: October 2006, ISBN 978-1-4051-5917-3; first appeared in Macroeconomic Dynamics, 5, 2001, pp. 101–131
