= Merrybrook =

Historic house in Virginia, United States

- U.S. National Register of Historic Places
- Virginia Landmarks Register
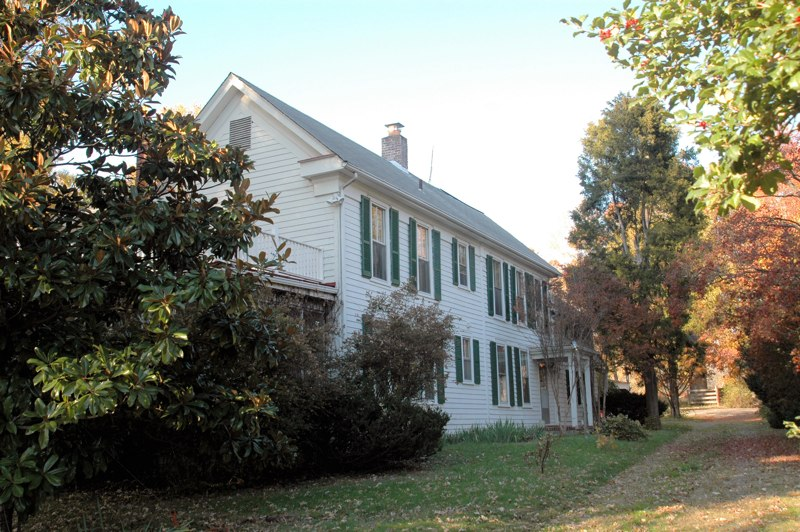
- Merrybrook in 2006

- Location within Northern Virginia Location within Virginia Location within the United States
- Nearest city: Herndon, Virginia, U.S.
- Coordinates: 38°57′20″N 77°24′31″W
- Area: less than one acre
- Built: 1820
- Architectural style: Greek Revival, Colonial Revival
- NRHP reference No.: 07000362
- VLR No.: 029-0245

Significant dates
- Added to NRHP: April 26, 2007
- Designated VLR: March 7, 2007

Merrybrook is the only known remaining home of American Civil War Confederate spy Laura Ratcliffe. The house is located south of Herndon, Virginia, in Fairfax County, Virginia. She lived here from the earliest days of the Civil War until her death in 1923. The interior, out-buildings and grounds still retain the atmosphere of earlier times.

In early March 2007, the Virginia Department of Historic Resources approved the current owner's application and placed Merrybrook on the Virginia Landmarks Register. The application to put Merrybrook on the National Historic Register is currently awaiting approval from the National Park Service. However, urban encroachment continues — the recent widening of Centreville Road was a near miss for Merrybrook, which still survives behind the trees.

== History ==
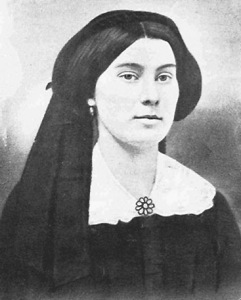
Laura Ratcliffe

As the great granddaughter of Richard Ratcliffe, the founder of Providence, now called Fairfax, Laura was born there May 28, 1836. When war came she immediately sought to support her family and neighbors. While caring for the wounded she was noticed by Col J. E. B. Stuart for whom she became a valuable spy. There was a large rock near her home where she would conceal money and messages for Col. Mosby. Stuart wrote admiring poems dedicated to her and finally asked her to marry him. Laura, true to her own strong moral convictions, declined. This was near the location of present-day Frying Pan Farm Park.

Laura was admired locally for her bravery and her beauty and was acknowledged by Col. Stuart in many ways. He presented her with a gold-embossed brown leather album with the following inscription on the front page: "Presented to Miss Laura Ratcliffe by her soldier-friend as a token of his high appreciation of her patriotism, admiration of her virtues, and pledge of his lasting esteem."

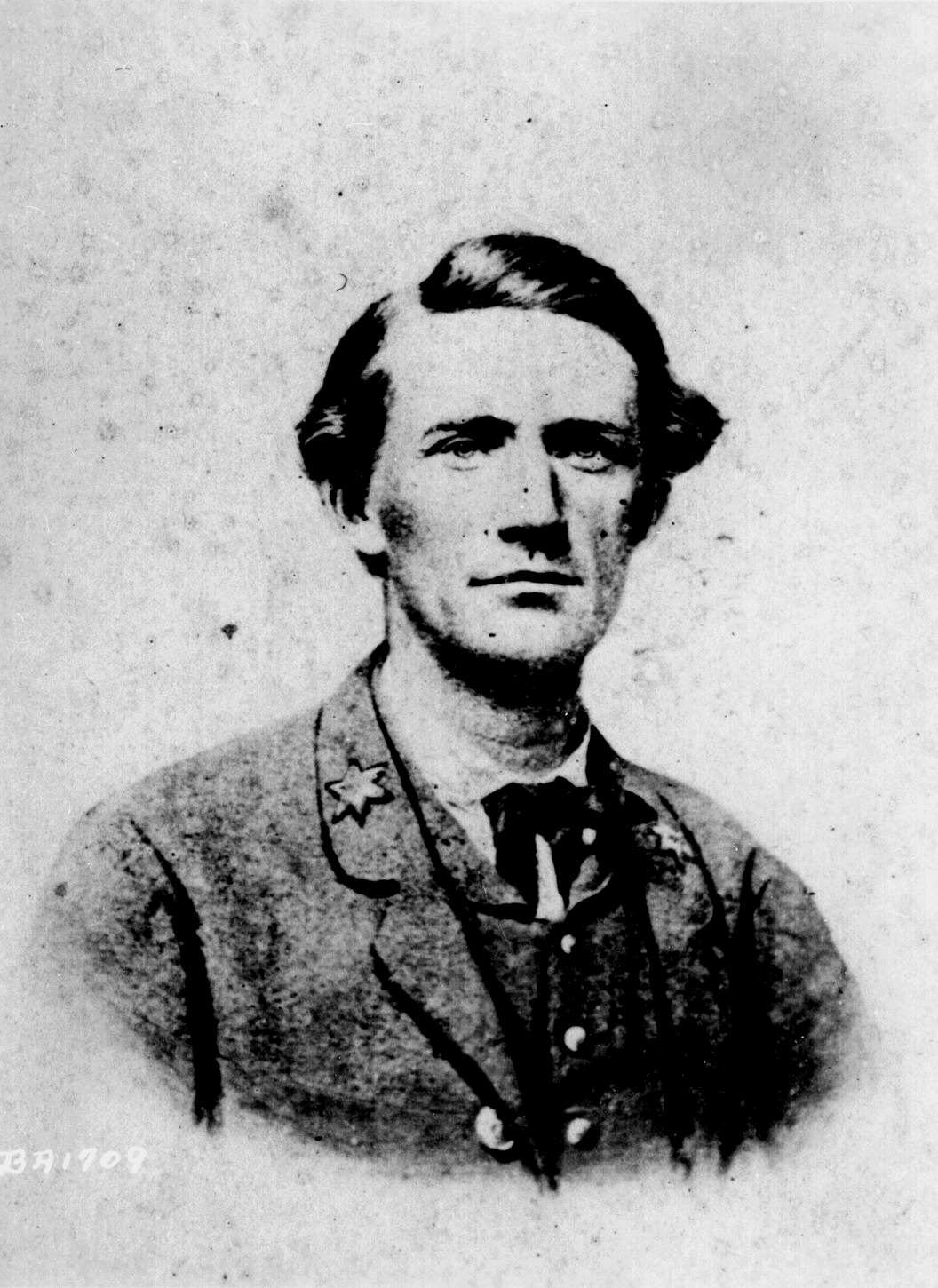
Colonel John S. Mosby

The album was signed not only by Stuart but also by many other soldiers who fought with him including Mosby and Brigadier General Fitzhugh Lee. Many of her local friends had also signed the book. She quietly kept this memoir, as well as Stuart's gold watch chain, among her possessions at Merrybrook. These items were discovered in her effects after her death.

Col. John Mosby, the famous Confederate Ranger harassed Union Army positions throughout this area. He rode into Fairfax City one night and snatched Union Brigadier General Edwin Stoughton out of his bed behind Union lines and made off with him.

February 7, 1863 - Col. Mosby was planning to raid the Union picket lines in Fairfax when he had word of a band of robbers nearby. These men had been stripping citizen's homes of valuables, stealing horses and even taking the local doctor's medical saddlebags after encountering him on the road. Mosby captured them and sent them to Richmond and returned the stolen property. He proceeded on the next day toward Union picket-post near Frying Pan Church.

That night a Union officer, Lt. Palmer of the First Virginia came to Laura's house to ask for some milk. He bragged to Laura that an ambush had been set for Mosby saying, "I know you would give Mosby any information in your possession; but, as you have no horses and the mud is too deep for women folks to walk, you can't tell him; so the next you hear of your 'pet' he will be either dead or our prisoner."

He underestimated her. Laura went out on foot across the fields to reach the home of George Coleman to ask him to watch Mosby. As luck would have it, her path crossed Mosby's and she was able to warn him herself, thus saving him from capture. He acknowledged his great debt to her in his memoirs.

Ratcliffe's assistance to Mosby, besides saving his life, included providing timely information on Union troop movements, hiding both men and money for him, and occasionally acting as "banker" for the Rangers. Till the end of the War, Laura worked in close cooperation with Mosby. He often used her home as his headquarters, and would meet his men at a large rock outcropping nearby, which was later known as "Mosby's Rock". This was also apparently where Laura successfully hid several thousand dollars entrusted to her after the Rangers had liberated it from a Union train.

The Virginia Department of Historic Resources approved a historical highway marker for Mosby's Rock in 2000 denoting its significance. Former residents, economist David I. Meiselman and poet Winifred Meiselman, worked for decades to preserve the home for future generations.
