= Meiselman =

Meiselman is a surname. Notable people with the surname include:

- Myron Meiselman

(1908-1998), American businessman and distinguished war veteran

- Alexander Meiselman (1900–1938), Russian writer, poet, and orientalist
- Avraham Elchanan Maizelman (1863-1928), Romanian Rabbi and scholar.
- David I. Meiselman (1924–2014), American economist
- Moshe Meiselman (born 1942), American Orthodox rabbi
- Winifred Meiselman (1934–2021), American media analyst and poet
