= Winifred Meiselman =

American media analyst and poet (1934–2021)

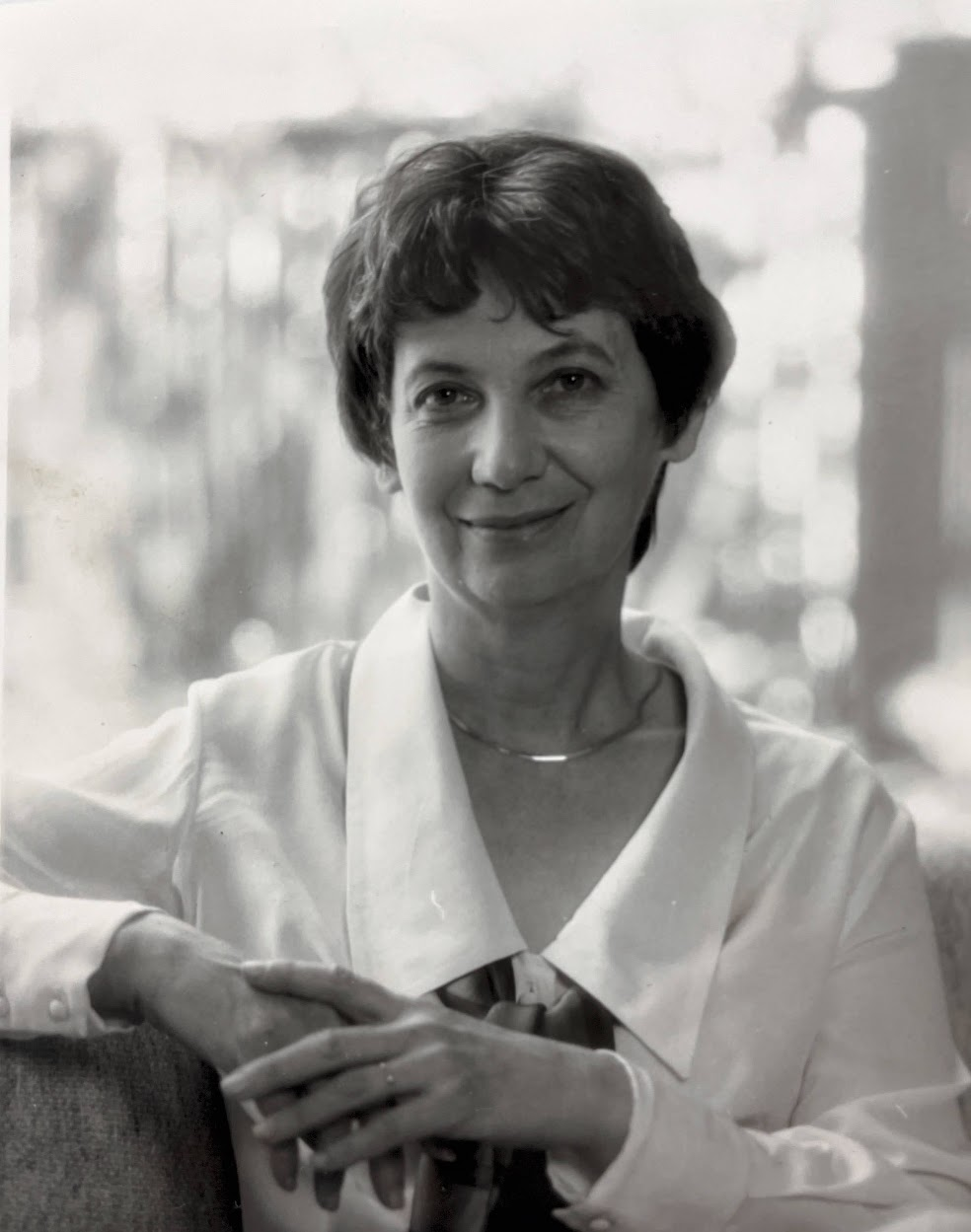
Portrait of Win

Winifred ("Win") Meiselman (1934-December 18, 2021) was the founder of the media group CAMERA, a historian of the American Civil War and specifically of Confederate spy Laura Ratcliffe, social worker, art therapist, poet, and artist.

== Personal life ==
Born in Brighton, a neighborhood in Boston, Massachusetts to Louis Charm, an electrical engineer who later worked on the particle accelerator for the United States' Manhattan Project in Oak Ridge, Tennessee, and Maybelle Charm. Meiselman attended Brighton High School.

Meiselman's older half-brother was Stanley E. Charm, founder of Charm Sciences Inc. in Lawrence, Massachusetts. She married David I. Meiselman, an important American economist and prominent monetarist, in 1965; he was then working at the World Bank in Washington, D.C.

== Education and early career ==
Meiselman attended the University of Massachusetts Amherst, where she was president of The Poetry Group; she met with prominent American poets such as Robert Frost, Dylan Thomas, and Robert Penn Warren. She later graduated with a BS in Early Child Development from the University of Minnesota and an MS in art therapy from George Washington University.

While living in St. Paul, Minnesota, Meiselman was first introduced to politics through protests of the Vietnam War on the campus of the University of Minnesota. Meiselman subsequently worked on the campaign of Eugene McCarthy in his 1968 challenge against President Lyndon Johnson.

Meiselman worked as a child psychologist and art therapist in Washington, DC following her move there with her family to Merrybrook in Herndon, Virginia in July 1971.

Meiselman first worked at the Northern Virginia Family Services in Oakton, Virginia and subsequently worked as the coordinator for outpatient services for the Department of Behavioral and Mental Health at Sibley Memorial Hospital in The Palisades neighborhood in Washington, D.C.

== Founding of CAMERA ==
Win and David Meiselman were active in fundraising for Jewish and Israel causes, and hosted a major fundraiser for Israel immediately following the 1973 Yom Kippur War at Merrybrook.

Meiselman was active in Jewish and Israel causes early on in her career, and met and became inspired by William R. Perl and his wife, Lore, who were instrumental for the idea and inspiration for her creating CAMERA through their active friendship.

During this time, Meiselman was also active in fundraising for other social causes, including the Jewish Family Services of Northern Virginia and Russian-Jewish immigrants in the United States, as well as Vietnamese-Cambodian immigrants following the war.

The initial inspiration for the creation of CAMERA was the invasion of Lebanon in 1981 by Israel and reporting on the subject by the Washington Post. The investigations into media bias continued to newspapers such as the New York Times, Boston Globe, Los Angeles Times, and outlets such as NPR, PBS, and ABC News. Andrea Levin agreed with Meiselman to open CAMERA's Boston branch in 1988 following Levin's publishing of a rebuttal of The Boston Globe's Israel reporting in a Newton, Massachusetts newspaper. Under Meiselman's leadership, CAMERA grew and opened branches in Chicago, Fort Lauderdale, Los Angeles, Miami, San Francisco, and Philadelphia. CAMERA was to later expand to other languages as well, such as Spanish, Hebrew, and Arabic.

Meiselman formed the Advisory Board to CAMERA with prominent Washingtonians such as Saul Stern and Bernard S. White, who were active in the charities in the D.C. area. Meiselman also recruited Senators Rudy Boschwitz and Chuck Grassley, Congressman Tom Lantos, journalist M. Stanton Evans, Ambassador Charles Lichenstein, Pastor Roy Stewart, and Rabbi David Yellin. Other personalities were close to Meiselman and the organization, such as Tom Lantos and Charles Krauthammer.

Meiselman assisted the Boston chapter (under Andrea Levin) to organize a major event in the history of CAMERA, the 1989 CAMERA conference in the Park Plaza Hotel in Boston. The conference drew a crowd of more than 1000 attendees, and featured speakers Norman Podhoretz, Alan Dershowitz, Ruth Wisse, Jerold Auerbach, and David Wyman. Joining these speakers were Win, Andrea Levin, later CAMERA leader.

In addition to her CAMERA leadership activities, Meiselman would debate issues surrounding Israel's media coverage and public policy on television, including call-in debates on C-Span.

Meiselman retired from CAMERA in 1991 due to health problems, and the leadership of the organization passed to Andrea Levin.

Despite her retirement from CAMERA, Meiselman continued to actively fundraise for Jewish causes, including her 2004 art auction at Merrybrook for the benefit of Jewish education in the former Soviet Union. Many artists contributed work for the auction, including donated works by Shalom Moskovitz (Shalom of Safed), Michoel Muchnik, Phillip Ratner, and more.

== Merrybrook and Friends of Laura Ratcliffe ==
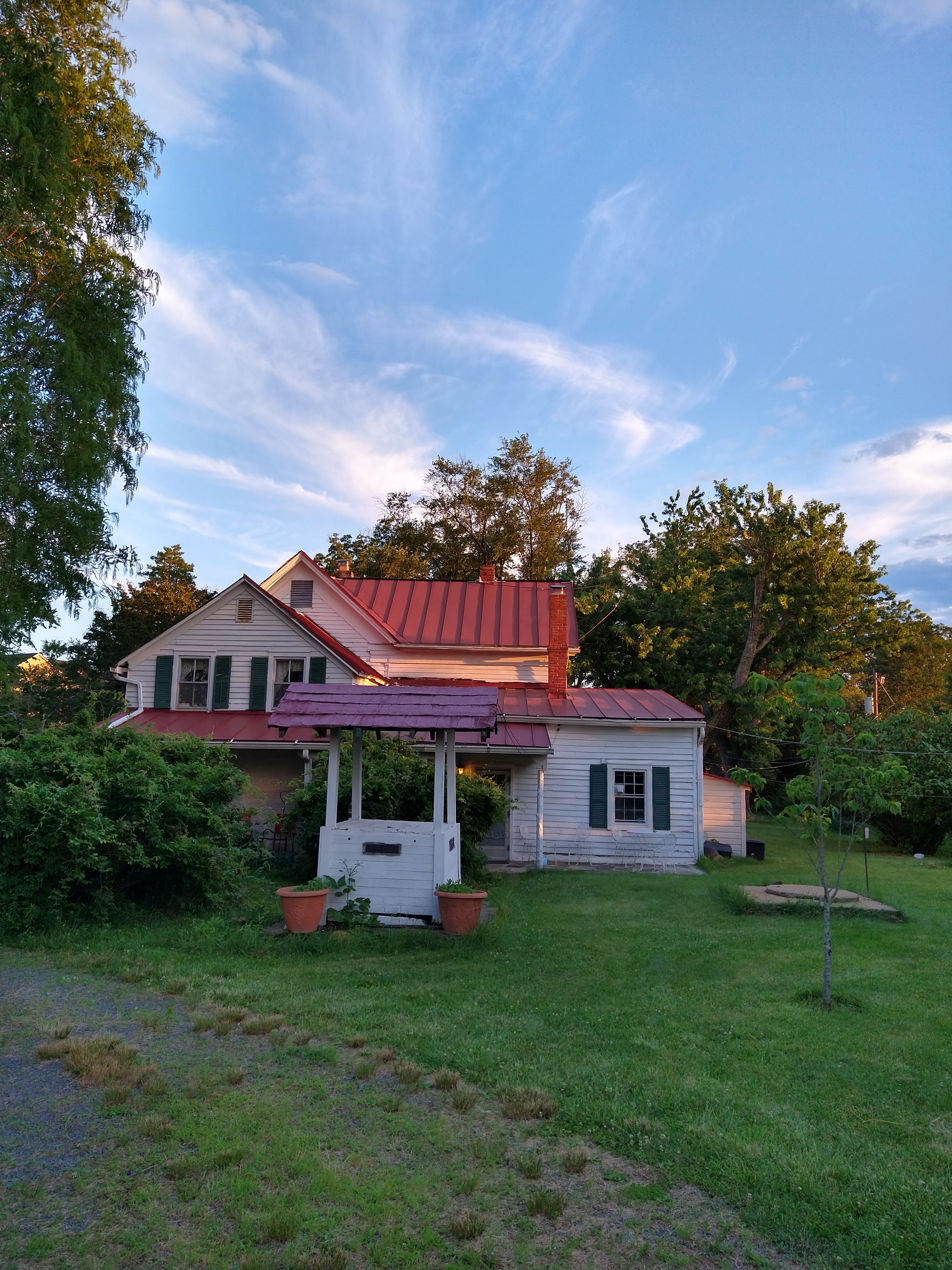
The historic well, the original structure of Merrybrook (1793), and the historical arbory.

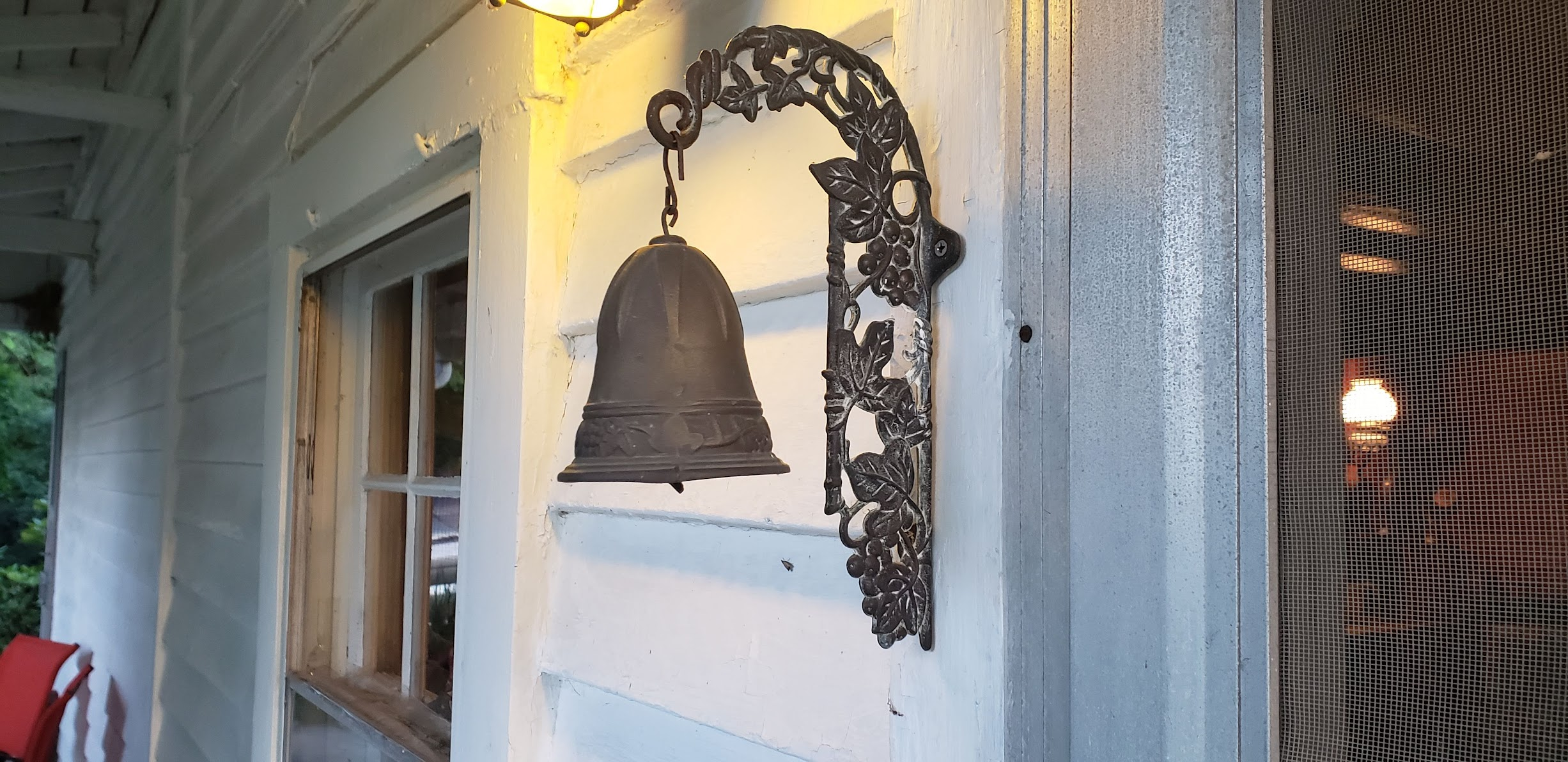
An original cowbell on the front porch of Merrybrook, 19th century

Following her retirement from CAMERA, Win worked as a private art therapist in Herndon.

The Meiselmans regularly opened Merrybrook for tours and teaching about the American Civil War. During the 1990s, rapid building and commercialization in the Dulles Corridor lead Win to seek Federal protection of Merrybrook from developers, and the fear of encroaching urbanization was a constant one for the Merrybrook Estate.

The home and property is historically important for Fairfax County history, as an 18th century farmhouse in Northern Virginia, and most prominently a place of importance for the Confederacy during the American Civil War. As the home of Laura Ratcliffe from the earliest days of the Civil War until her death, it was Laura's only remaining property and the likely hideaway spot for Confederate soldiers during the Bristoe Campaign.

The home also had unique and historical architectural features, such as the 1793 kitchen ceiling being cut from the curved flank of an 18th-century Pennsylvania barge, original blown-glass windows (which cracked from the rattling of the ground from the Concorde during liftoff at Dulles Airport), a Jefferson staircase modeled after the one in Monticello, a hallway with an upward-diagonal ceiling (following its destruction by the Union Army burning during the Bristoe Campaign and subsequent rebuild), and an elegant 19th-century Washingtonian drawing room.

The property also has historically-important structures such as a 19th-century Loudoun Barn and an 18th-century well, as well as a slave's quarters built during the early 19th century.

Win and David successfully had the home preserved by the Virginia Department of Historic Resources and on the Virginia Historic Landmarks Register. This included the introduction of the 2007 Merrybrook Law to the Virginia General Assembly introducing resident curatorship to historical properties in Virginia. Win's work as leader of the Friends of Laura Ratcliffe, as well as her work fundraising and building awareness, was instrumental in Merrybrook's preservation and awarded status.

== Poetic and artistic legacy ==
Meiselman left hundreds of poems in manuscript, a selection of which she independently published in 2017. Meiselman was also an artist, painter, and gardener.
