= Facts and Logic About the Middle East =

Pro-Israel information disseminator

Facts and Logic About the Middle East (FLAME) is a non-profit pro-Israel organization based in San Francisco, California. The Los Angeles Times described FLAME as "an organization that must literally buy its way into print."

FLAME claims its ads are meant as an explanation for "the proverbial man from Mars" regarding various aspects of Arab/Israeli issues.

== History ==
It was founded by Gerardo Joffe and began as a local chapter of the pro-Israel media watchdog group CAMERA. By 1987 the ads, which had appeared using the CAMERA name were now sponsored by FLAME, an independent organization. Its stated purpose is "the research and publication of the facts regarding developments in the Middle East and exposing false propaganda that might harm the interests of the United States and its allies in that area of the world."

Since 1987, it has regularly placed ads that it describes as "monthly hasbarah (educating and clarifying) messages in major publications of general circulation, such as U.S. News and World Report, The New York Times, The Nation, The National Review, The American Spectator, The Washington Times National Weekly, and others". The New York Times' Anthony Lewis described one such advertisement as "a sorry evasion of reality".

According to The Village Voice, when a reporter "pointed out the overt bigotry" in a FLAME ad in 1998 that described Islam as "virulent" and blamed it for promoting violence against the U.S. and Israel, FLAME's Gerardo Joffe said "All Arab Muslims may not be a bunch of fanatics, but I've never met one who isn't".

Regarding the issue of a Palestinian state, FLAME is in favor of using Jordan as the homeland for Arab Palestinians.
