= Committee for Accuracy in Middle East Reporting and Analysis =

American pro-Israel nonprofit

- CAMERA logo, without the full name below
- Formation: 1982
- Founder: Winifred Meiselman
- Type: Non-profit; NGO
- Tax ID no.: 52-1332702
- Purpose: Pro-Israel media advocacy
- Headquarters: Boston, Massachusetts, U.S.
- Region served: Global
- National President: Andrea Levin
- Volunteers: Over 65,000 (according to CAMERA)
- Website: camera.org

The Committee for Accuracy in Middle East Reporting and Analysis (CAMERA), formerly the Committee for Accuracy in Middle East Reporting in America, is an American nonprofit pro-Israel media-monitoring, research, and membership organization. According to its website, CAMERA is "devoted to promoting accurate and balanced coverage of Israel and the Middle East." The group says it was founded in 1982 "to respond to The Washington Post's coverage of Israel's Lebanon incursion", and to respond to what it considers the media's "general anti-Israel bias".

CAMERA is known for its media monitoring and advocacy. It releases reports to counter what it calls "frequently inaccurate and skewed characterizations of Israel and of events in the Middle East" that it believes may fuel anti-Israel and anti-Jewish prejudice. The group mobilizes protests against what it deems unfair media coverage by issuing full-page ads in newspapers, organizing demonstrations, and encouraging sponsors to withhold funds.

CAMERA's critics have called it an "extreme Israel advocacy group" and said it is aligned with hawkish right-wing viewpoints, pays stipended fellows to write anti-Palestinian articles, and employs smear and intimidation tactics, routinely targeting media and journalists critical of Israel and pro-Palestinian activists on campuses.

== History ==
CAMERA has chapters in major U.S. cities and Israel, including New York City, Chicago, Washington, D.C., Los Angeles, Miami, and in 1988 a Boston chapter and headquarters (founded and led by Andrea Levin); Charles Jacobs later became deputy director of the Boston chapter.

In 1991, Levin succeeded Winifred Meiselman as executive director of CAMERA. According to the organization's website, CAMERA's membership grew from 1,000 in 1991 to 55,000 in 2007. The director of CAMERA's Washington office is Eric Rozenman.

In 2002, The Jewish Daily Forward named CAMERA executive director and regular Jerusalem Post contributor Andrea Levin America's fifth most influential Jewish citizen, writing, "Media-monitoring was the great proxy war of the last year, and its general is Andrea Levin."

In 2008, CAMERA launched a campaign to alter Wikipedia articles to support the Israeli side of the Israeli–Palestinian conflict. The campaign suggested that pro-Israeli editors should pretend to be interested in other topics until elected as administrators. Once administrators, they were to misuse their administrative powers to suppress pro-Palestinian editors and support pro-Israel editors. Some members of this conspiracy were banned by Wikipedia administrators.

== Structure, staff, and activities ==
On its website, CAMERA calls itself "a media-monitoring, research and membership organization devoted to promoting accurate and balanced coverage of Israel and the Middle East" that "fosters rigorous reporting, while educating news consumers about Middle East issues and the role of the media." CAMERA also calls itself a "non-partisan organization" that "takes no position with regard to American or Israeli political issues or with regard to ultimate solutions to the Arab–Israeli conflict." In 2008, CAMERA complained that the Conference of Presidents of Major American Jewish Organizations (of which it is a member) did not consult it before disinviting Republican vice-presidential nominee Sarah Palin to an anti-Ahmadinejad rally. CAMERA has also criticized the Israeli non-governmental organization B'Tselem for some of its reporting on Israel.

When CAMERA perceives an inaccurate statement in the media, it says it gathers information, sends findings, and asks for a printed or broadcast correction. CAMERA lists 46 news outlets it says have issued corrections based on its work. The organization also publishes monographs about topics relating to the Arab-Israeli conflict. CAMERA reports it has over 65,000 paying members.

CAMERA runs a student-focused site containing specialized information available for countering misinformation. It also provides one-on-one assistance to students who encounter Middle East distortions in campus publications, flyers, rallies and classroom teaching. CAMERA has offered student representative positions that include compensation and training in Israel.

CAMERA-UK (formerly UK Media Watch and BBC Watch) is the UK division of CAMERA.

== Criticism by CAMERA ==
Among the organizations and works that have been criticized by CAMERA are:

=== National Public Radio ===
CAMERA's 2001 report "A Record of Bias: National Public Radio's Coverage of the Arab–Israeli Conflict: September 26 – November 26, 2000" asserted that National Public Radio's "coverage of the Arab–Israeli conflict has long been marred by a striking anti-Israel tilt, with severe bias, error and lack of balance commonplace." CAMERA supported a boycott of NPR, and demanded the firing of NPR's foreign editor, Loren Jenkins. CAMERA said that Jenkins had a long record of partisanship in favor of Palestinian views, and let his personal views tilt NPR's coverage. CAMERA also said Jenkins compared Israel to Nazi Germany in his writings and referred to it as a "colonizer".

NPR's then-Ombudsman, Jeffrey Dvorkin, said in a 2002 interview that CAMERA used selective citations and subjective definitions of what it considers pro-Palestinian bias in formulating its findings, and that he felt CAMERA's campaign was "a kind of McCarthyism, frankly, that bashes us and causes people to question our commitment to doing this story fairly. And it exacerbates the legitimate anxieties of many in the Jewish community about the survival of Israel."

=== "Israel's Jewish Defamers" ===
In October 2007, CAMERA organized a conference called "Israel's Jewish Defamers", in which a panel of discussants accused Jewish critics of Israel, as well as one of Israel's leading newspapers, Haaretz, of distortions and falsehoods about Israel. CAMERA director Andrea Levin said the Jewish critics—who included Richard Falk of Princeton University, writer Norman Finkelstein, New York Review of Books contributor Henry Siegman, former New York Times columnist Anthony Lewis, Trent University professor Michael Neumann, and Tikkun magazine publisher Michael Lerner—were guilty of "demonstrably false and baseless defaming of Israel, wildly distorted out-of-context accusations against Israel." Among the panelists were writer Cynthia Ozick and Harvard psychiatrist Kenneth Levin, who likened the Jewish critics to chronically abused children.

In response, Anthony Lewis told the New York Sun that the conference was "about a nonexistent phenomenon", noting that Jewish criticism of Israeli policies was not necessarily defamatory. Haaretz's editor-in-chief, David Landau, refused to comment on the conference, calling it "a matter of policy and principle" not to respond to CAMERA, which he called "McCarthyite". Tikkun editor Michael Lerner also rejected the notion that he was anti-Israel.

=== Quotation misattributed to Moshe Ya'alon ===
In 2009, CAMERA investigated the dissemination of a quotation widely misattributed to Moshe Ya'alon: "The Palestinians must be made to understand in the deepest recesses of their consciousness that they are a defeated people". The quotation was attributed to a 2002 Haaretz interview, but Ya'alon never said it. CAMERA tracked publications that printed the quotation, such as The New York Times, the Chicago Tribune, Boston Globe, the Toronto Star, and Time, which later issued corrections.

=== The New York Times's coverage of the Israeli–Palestinian conflict ===
In 2012, CAMERA released a monograph analyzing six months of The New York Times's coverage of Israel, calling it "a disproportionate, continuous, embedded indictment of Israel that dominates both news and commentary sections".

== Reception ==
CAMERA has both critics and supporters. Gershom Gorenberg, a journalist for The American Prospect, has written that CAMERA is "Orwellian-named" and that "like others engaged in the narrative wars, it does not understand the difference between advocacy and accuracy". Other critics have called CAMERA a special interest group with a pro-Israeli bias. Holocaust survivor Elie Wiesel, U.S. Senator Joe Lieberman, Harvard Law Professor Alan Dershowitz, and former Israeli cabinet minister Natan Sharansky have assisted CAMERA in its fundraising efforts by speaking at its national conference. Former U.S. Representative Tom Lantos was previously on CAMERA's advisory board.

In a 2003 profile of the organization in The Boston Globe, Mark Jurkowitz wrote, "its detractors see CAMERA as a myopic and vindictive special interest group trying to muscle its views into media coverage. ... To many in the media CAMERA is ... an advocacy group trying to impose its pro-Israeli views on mainstream journalism." Mitchell Kaidy, writing in the Washington Report on Middle East Affairs, criticized CAMERA's efforts to pressure university libraries to remove books the organization finds offensive.

=== Journalists ===
- Writing in The Nation in 1987, journalist and author Robert I. Friedman described CAMERA as having been formed in the wake of Israel's 1982 invasion of Lebanon "to keep the U.S. press in line", noting that the organization's activities at the time included publishing a newsletter and placing advertisements in The Christian Science Monitor and The New Republic in support of Israel's West Bank settlement policies. According to Friedman, "CAMERA, the A.D.L., AIPAC and the rest of the lobby don't want fairness, but bias in their favor. And they are prepared to use McCarthyite tactics, as well as the power and money of pro-Israel PACs, to get whatever Israel wants."
- In his 2006 book Public Editor #1, former New York Times public editor Daniel Okrent expressed gratitude to CAMERA as a notable example of organizations that "maintained an evenness of tone and an openness of communication no matter how much they disagreed" with his columns.
- Ian Mayes, president of the Organisation of News Ombudsmen in Britain, wrote in 2006 that CAMERA's methods seemed to go beyond reasonable calls for accountability. He mentioned CAMERA's campaign against NPR's reporting on the Middle East, in which he says CAMERA attempted to influence NPR's supporters to withhold funds.
- Writing about criticisms from CAMERA he and his colleagues have received, Jerusalem-based journalist Gershom Gorenberg wrote in 2007, "It is not the press's job to provide PR for any government. Until CAMERA gets this straight, self-respecting journalists will regard an occasional snarl from the watchdog as proof that they're doing their job."
- In 2008, Jonathan Cook listed CAMERA among "Zionist watchdogs" that "created what the late Edward Said called 'the last taboo in American public life', moving rapidly to shut down any signs of critical debate about Israeli policies or US support for such policies either in the American media or in Washington's corridors of power".
- In a 2008 article in The American Prospect, Gorenberg said of CAMERA's planned influence campaign to push a pro-Israel narrative on Wikipedia, "The affair is also a reminder—not the first—that CAMERA is ready to exempt itself from the demands for accuracy that it aims at the media. And like others engaged in the narrative wars, it does not understand the difference between advocacy and accuracy."

=== The Atlanta Journal-Constitution ===
The Atlanta Journal-Constitution described CAMERA's place in a debate among various Jewish groups about an apology former U.S. President Jimmy Carter made for statements he had made about Israel. Rabbi Marvin Hier, founder of the Simon Wiesenthal Center, said it was not right to outright dismiss his apology. CAMERA said true repentance required Carter to reverse any of the perceived harm he caused, and called on him to take "concrete actions to redress troubling false statements" the group said he made about the war Israel waged in Gaza. Ira Forman, chief executive of the Washington-based National Jewish Democratic Council, said it was "mensch-like" to accept and encourage Carter's remarks.

=== Academia ===
In 1986, Florida International University political science professor Cheryl A. Rubenberg said CAMERA was "another pro-Israeli organization that was formed after 1982 to monitor the media". She added that CAMERA was one of several 'new groups' that constituted the "Israeli lobby" at the time.

In 1988, Edward Said, a Palestinian-American political activist and Professor of English and Comparative Literature at Columbia University, argued that not even the Israeli government has ventured arguments as extreme as CAMERA, and that "surely, the Israeli lobby can find better propaganda methods than this!"

== CAMERA campaign at Wikipedia ==
In April 2008, The Electronic Intifada reported on the existence of a Google group set up by CAMERA. The group's stated purpose was to "help us keep Israel-related entries on Wikipedia from becoming tainted by anti-Israel editors". The Electronic Intifada accused CAMERA of "orchestrating a secret, long-term campaign to infiltrate the popular online encyclopedia Wikipedia to rewrite Palestinian history, pass off crude propaganda as fact, and take over Wikipedia administrative structures to ensure these changes go either undetected or unchallenged". Andre Oboler, a Legacy Heritage Fellow at the Israeli non-governmental organization NGO Monitor, responded, "Electronic Intifada is manufacturing a story."

Excerpts of some of the emails were published in the July 2008 issue of Harper's Magazine under the title "Candid camera". In April 2008, CAMERA's Gilead Ini would not confirm that the messages were genuine but said there was a CAMERA email campaign that adhered to Wikipedia's rules. In August 2008, Ini argued the excerpts published in Harper's were unrepresentative and that CAMERA had campaigned "toward encouraging people to learn about and edit the online encyclopedia for accuracy".

A group of Wikipedia administrators strongly believed an editor on Wikipedia, "Gni", to be Ini and blocked their account indefinitely. In April 2008, Ini refused to say whether he was behind the Gni account, and in May he denied that the account belonged to him, by which time he had deleted the Google group. Andre Oboler alleged that groups such as "Wikipedians for Palestine", established in January 2006 and by then also no longer online, had engaged in similar practices. Electronic Intifada co-founder Ali Abunimah said his group would never encourage a similar email campaign. Gorenberg said: "CAMERA is ready to exempt itself from the demands for accuracy that it aims at the media. And like others engaged in the narrative wars, it does not understand the difference between advocacy and accuracy." Gorenberg criticized CAMERA for telling members not to share information about the campaign with media and said that Ini's definition of accuracy "only means not printing anything embarrassing to his own side". David Shamah of The Jerusalem Post said, "the vast anti-Israel lobby that haters of our country have managed to pull together" hate it when groups like CAMERA mess up "their anti-Israel propaganda with (gasp!) facts".

Five editors involved in the campaign were sanctioned by Wikipedia administrators, who wrote that Wikipedia's open nature "is fundamentally incompatible with the creation of a private group to surreptitiously coordinate editing".

== See also ==
- Media coverage of the Arab–Israeli conflict
- Facts and Logic About the Middle East (FLAME)
- HonestReporting media watchdog "dedicated to defending Israel against prejudice in the Media"
- If Americans Knew, a US-based media-monitoring organization which covers much the same issues, but from an opposing viewpoint.
- Jewish Internet Defense Force
