= Floris Historic District =

Historic district in Virginia, United States

- U.S. National Register of Historic Places
- U.S. Historic district
- Virginia Landmarks Register
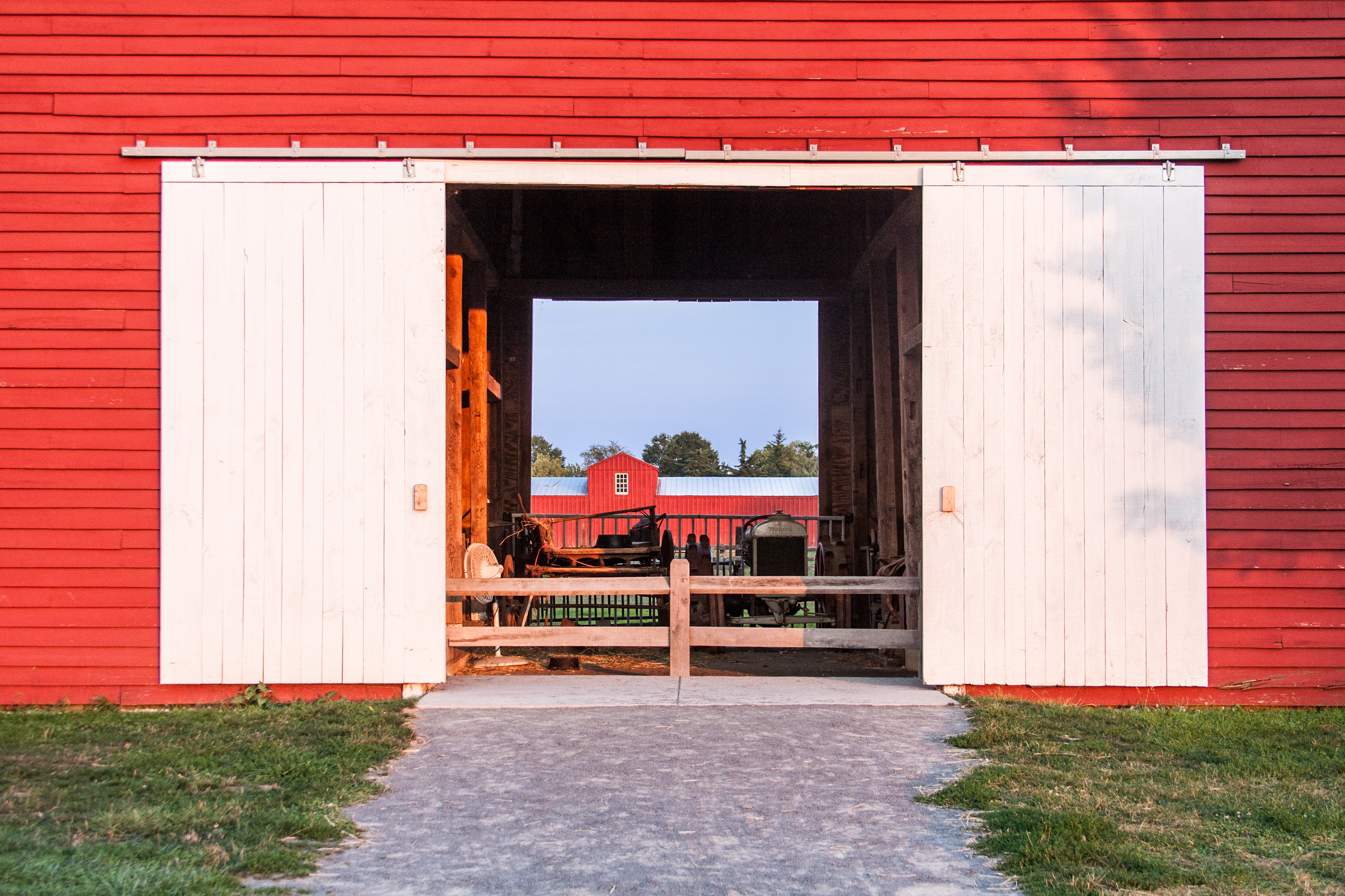
- Kidwell Farm

- Location within Northern Virginia Location within Virginia Location within the United States
- Location: Bounded by Centreville Rd., W. Ox Rd., Monroe St., and Frying Pan Branch, near Herndon, Virginia
- Coordinates: 38°56′17″N 77°24′27″W
- NRHP reference No.: 10000543
- VLR No.: 029-5179

Significant dates
- Added to NRHP: August 12, 2010
- Designated VLR: September 17, 2009

Floris Historic District is a historic district that is listed on the U.S. National Register of Historic Places (NRHP).

It's located in the vicinity of the town of Herndon, Virginia, and just about one mile east of Dulles International Airport.

It includes the last remaining working farm in Fairfax County, Virginia, the Frying Pan Farm, which is now also a park. Within that park contributing resources are the Ellmore Farm, Kidwell Farm, the Floris Vocational Technical High School Shop, the Floris School, Lee Farm Site, Frying Pan Meetinghouse. Contributing resources outside the park, nearby, are: Higgins House, Fox House, Cherok House/Cockerill-McFarland House Site, Floris Methodist Church and Stover House.

== Gallery ==
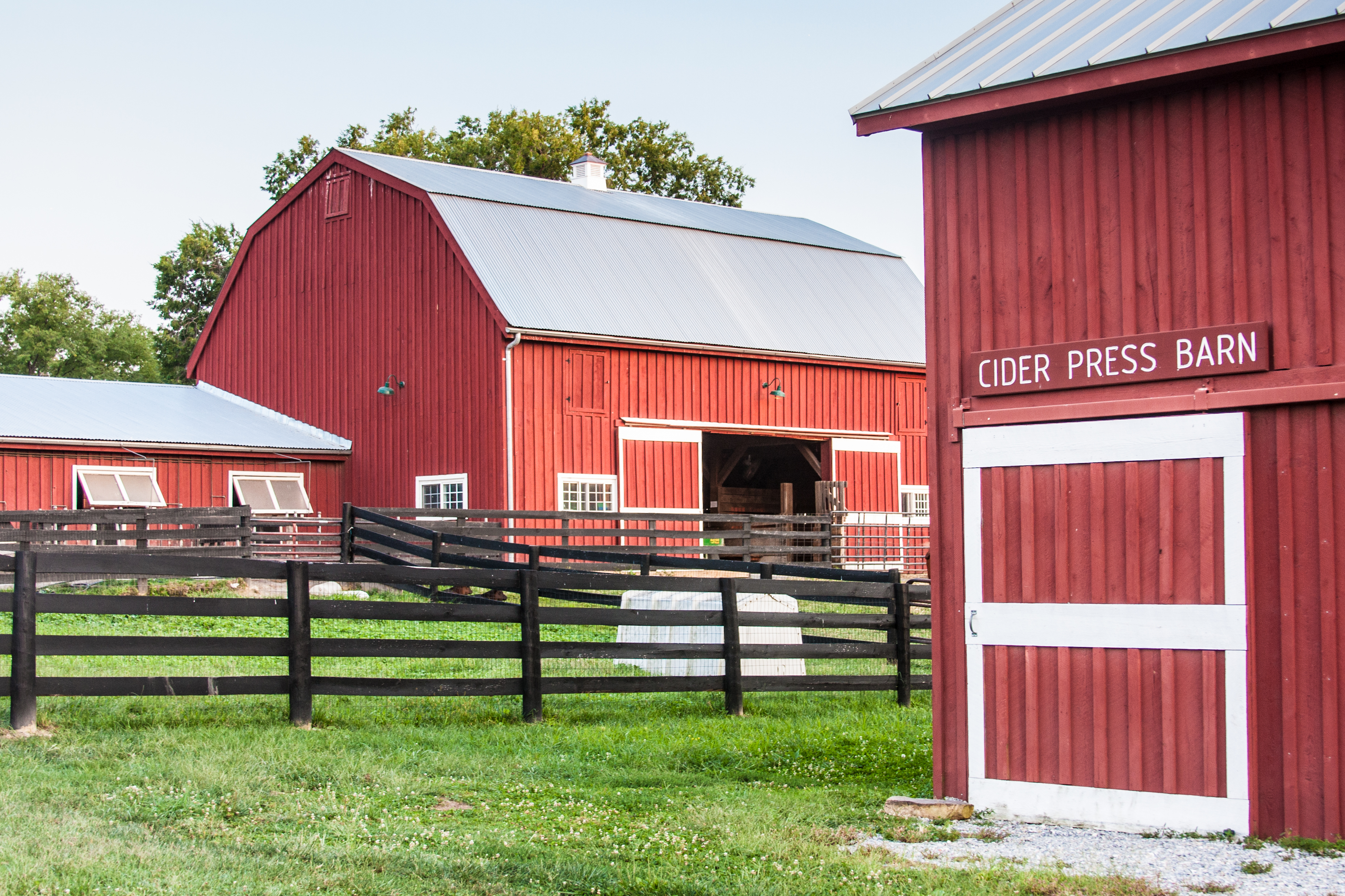

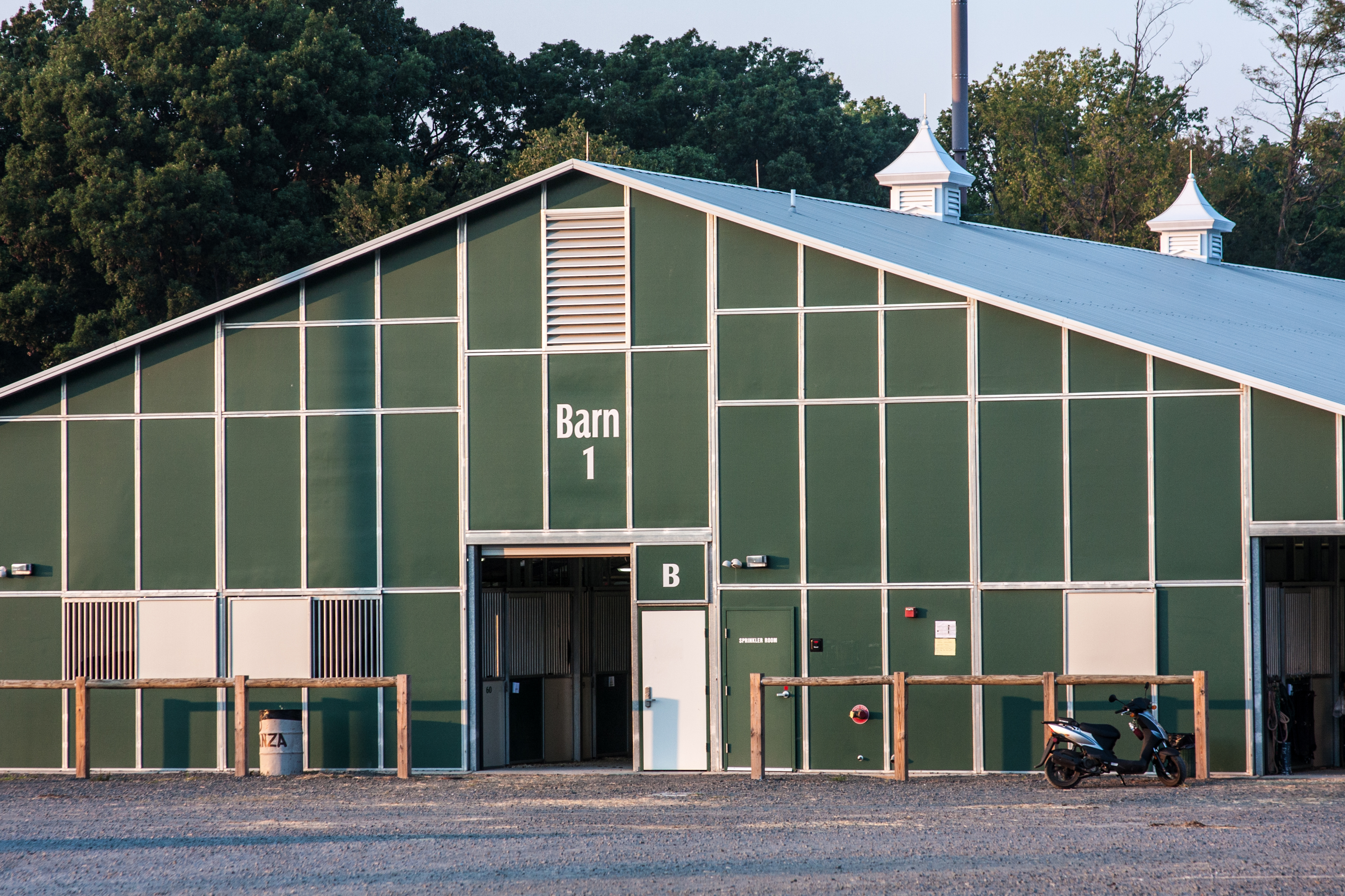

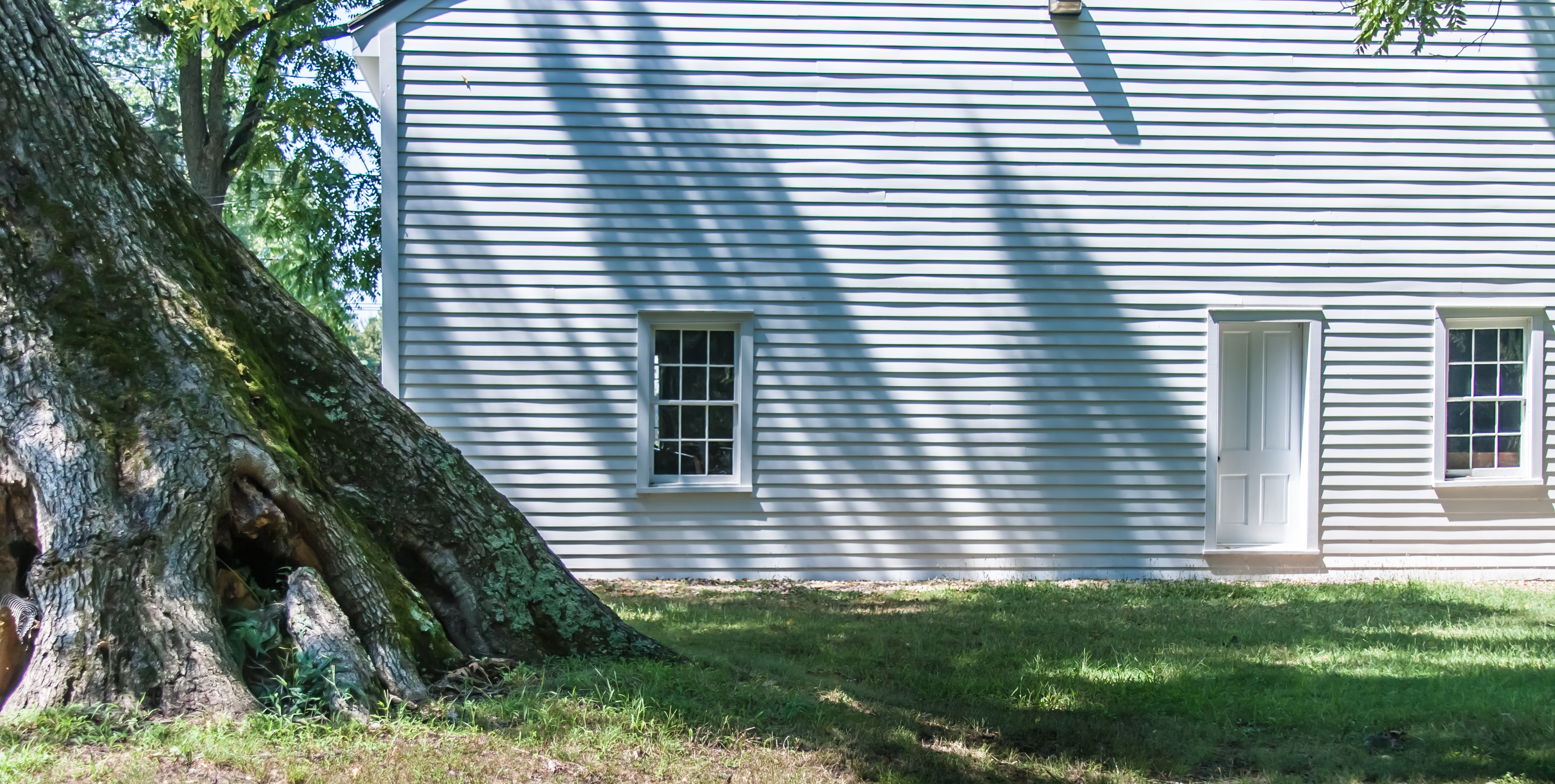

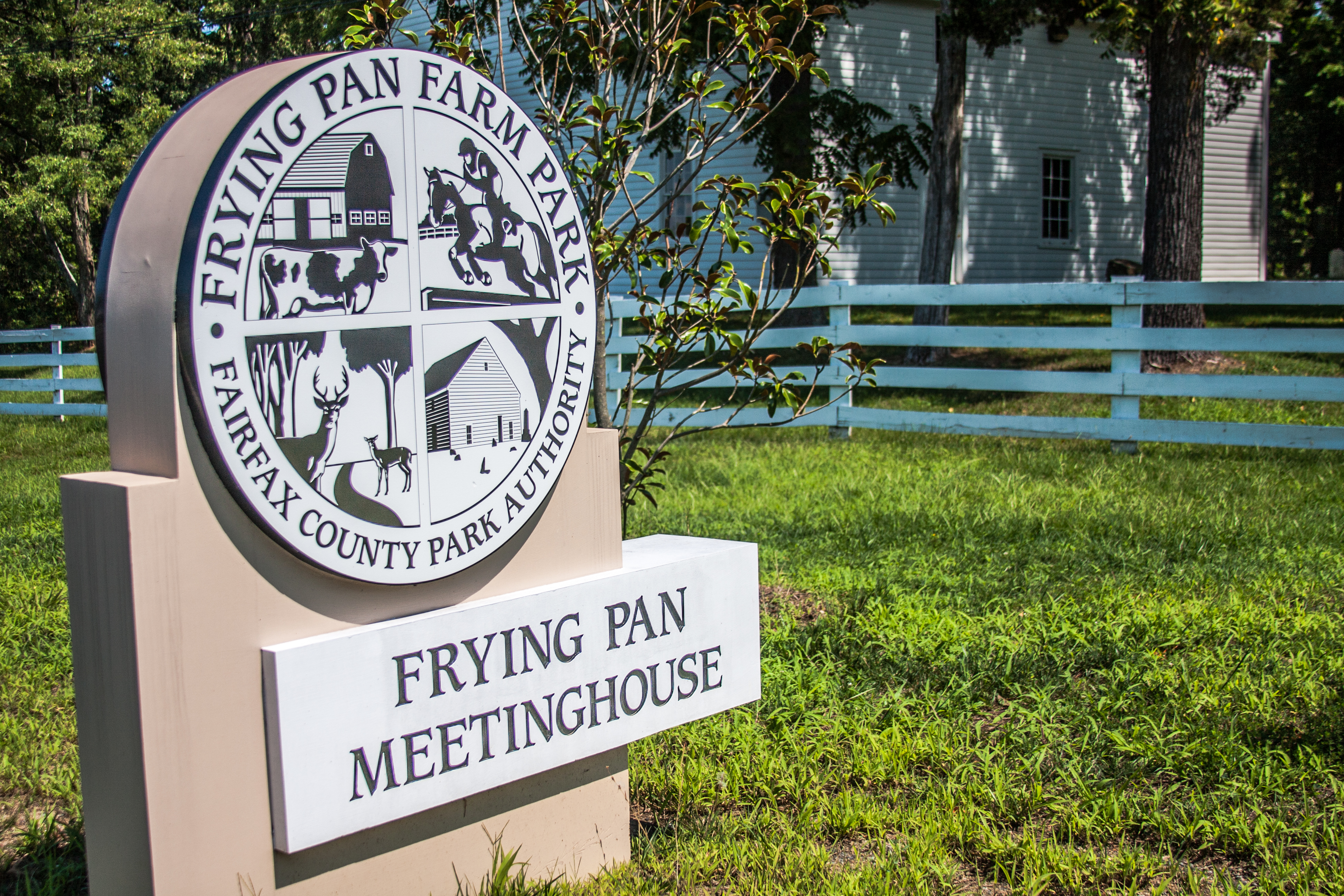

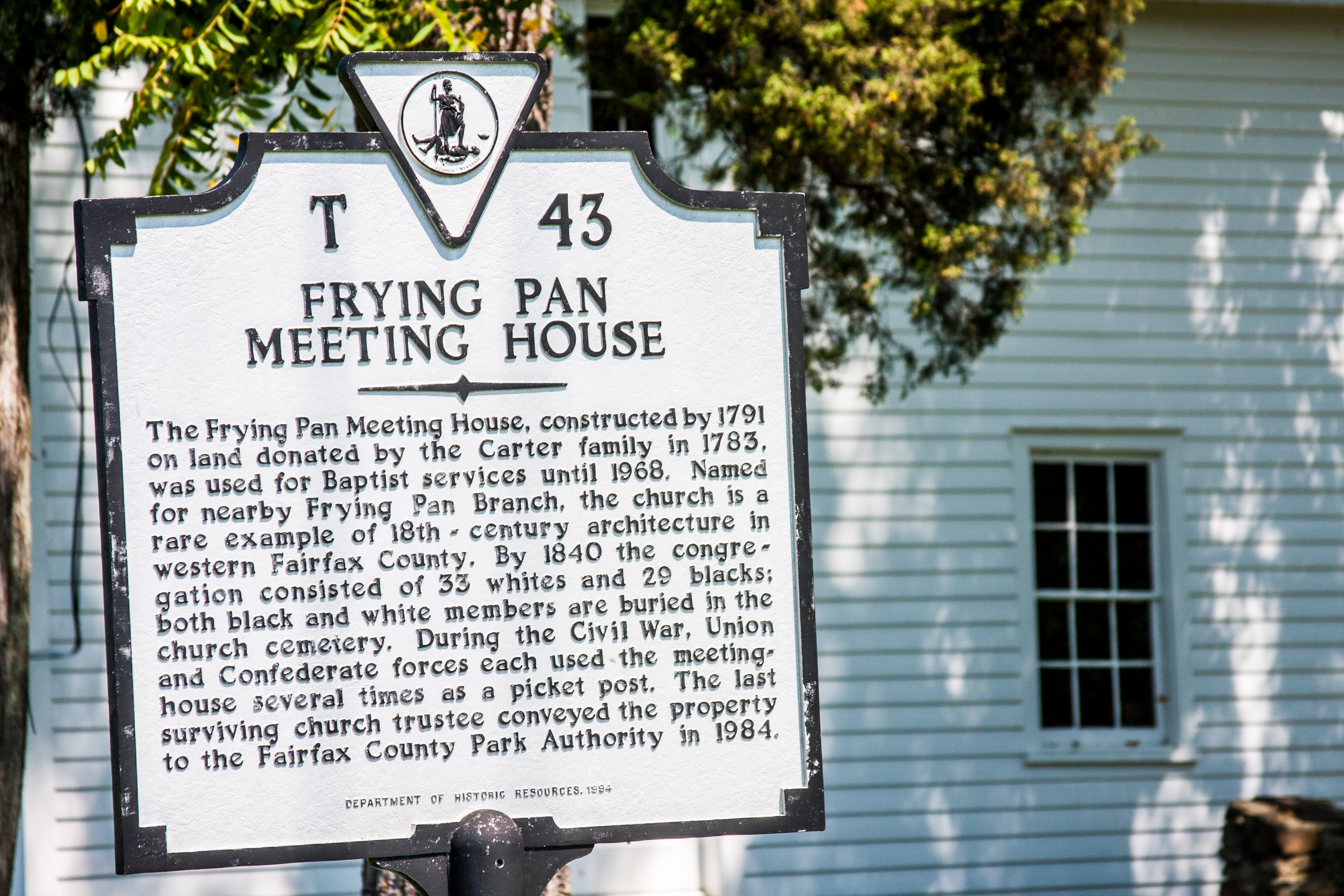

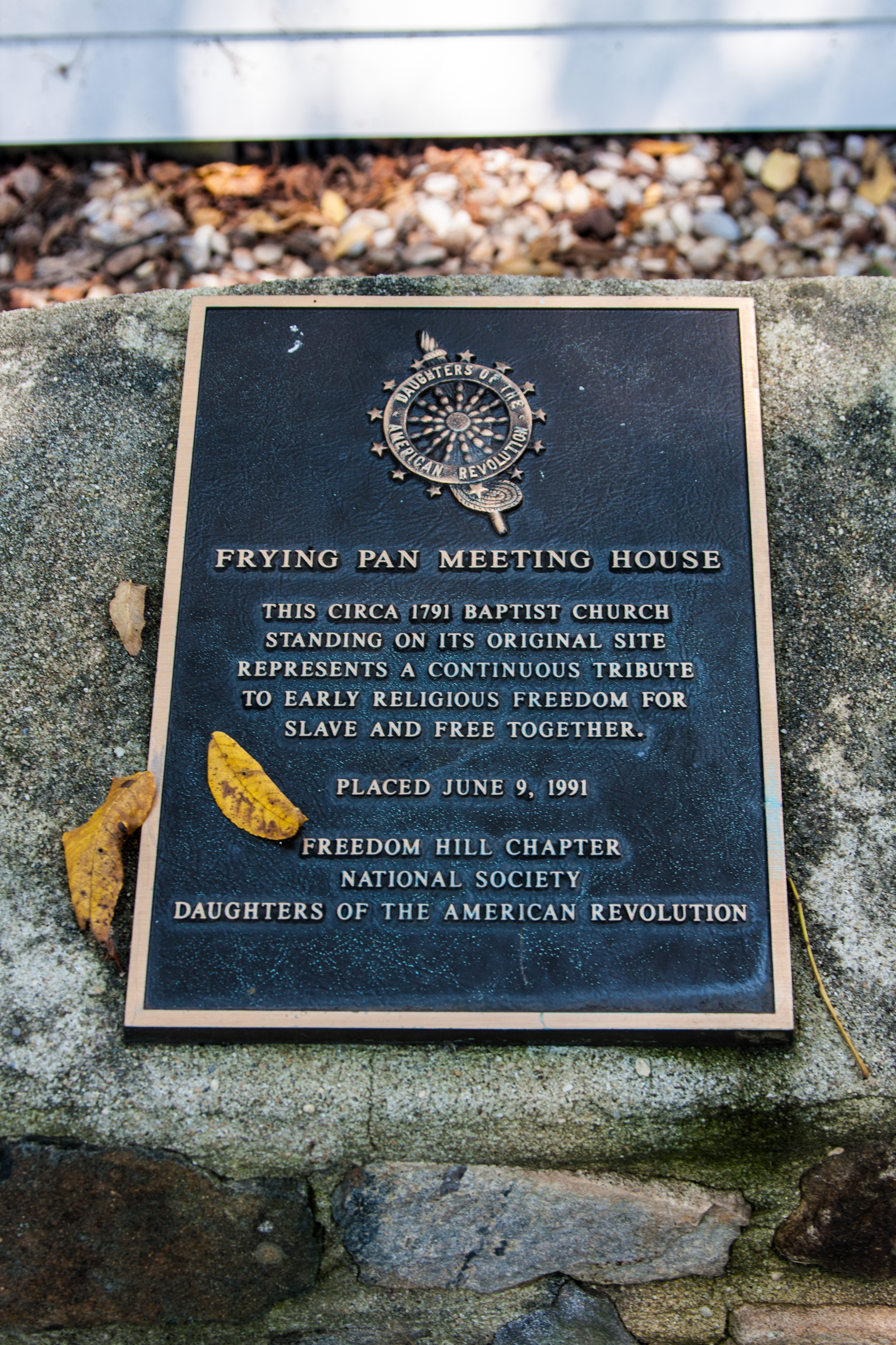

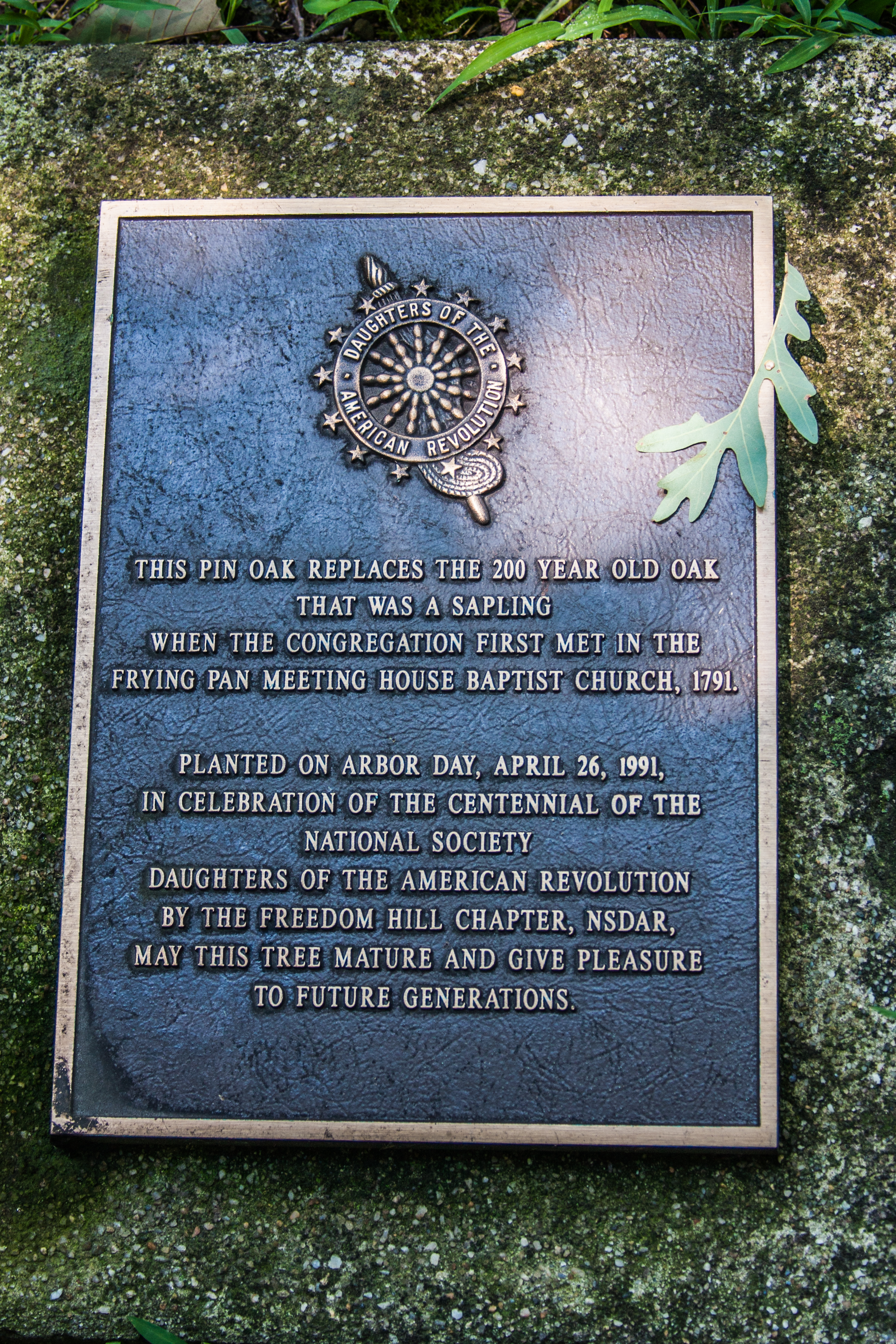

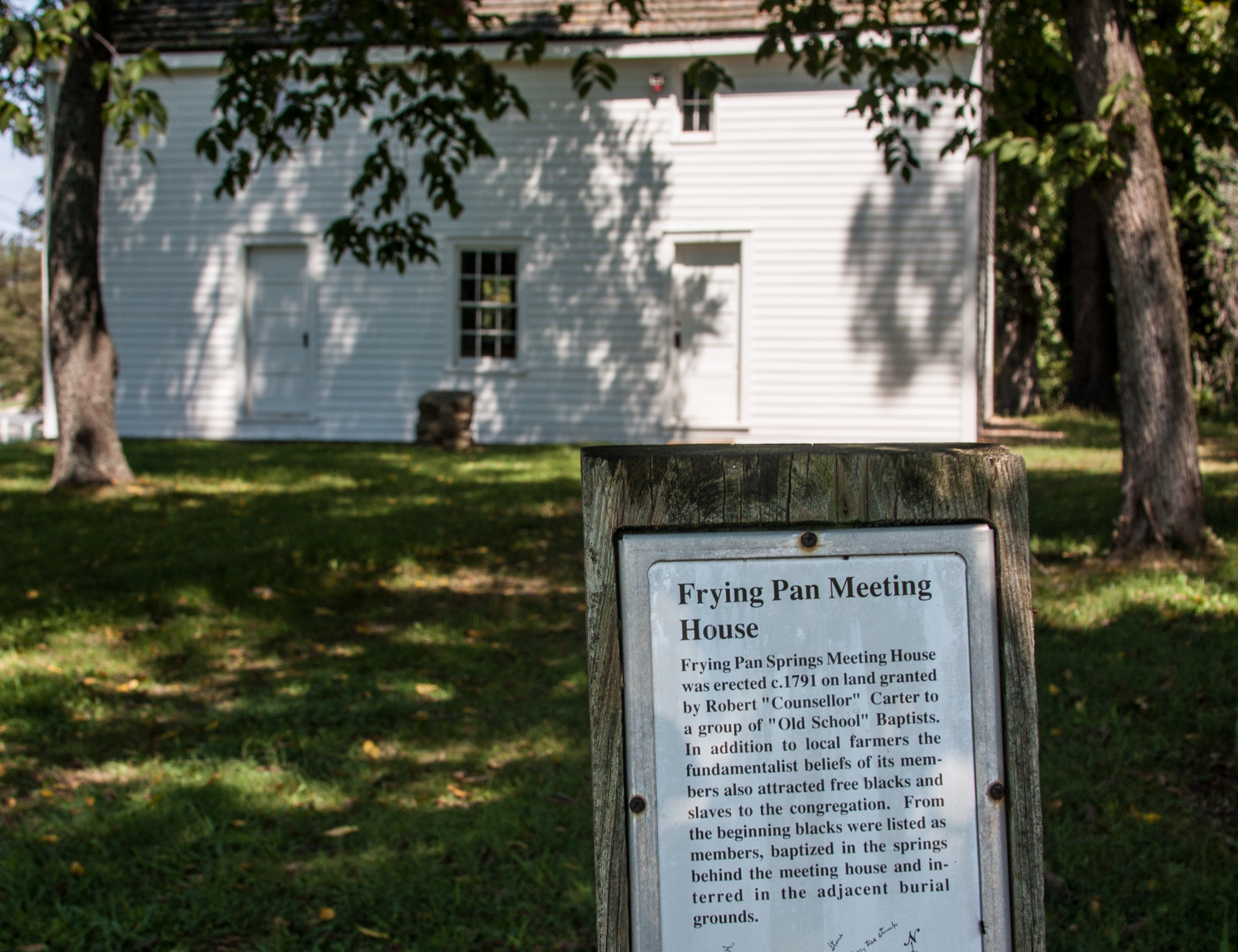

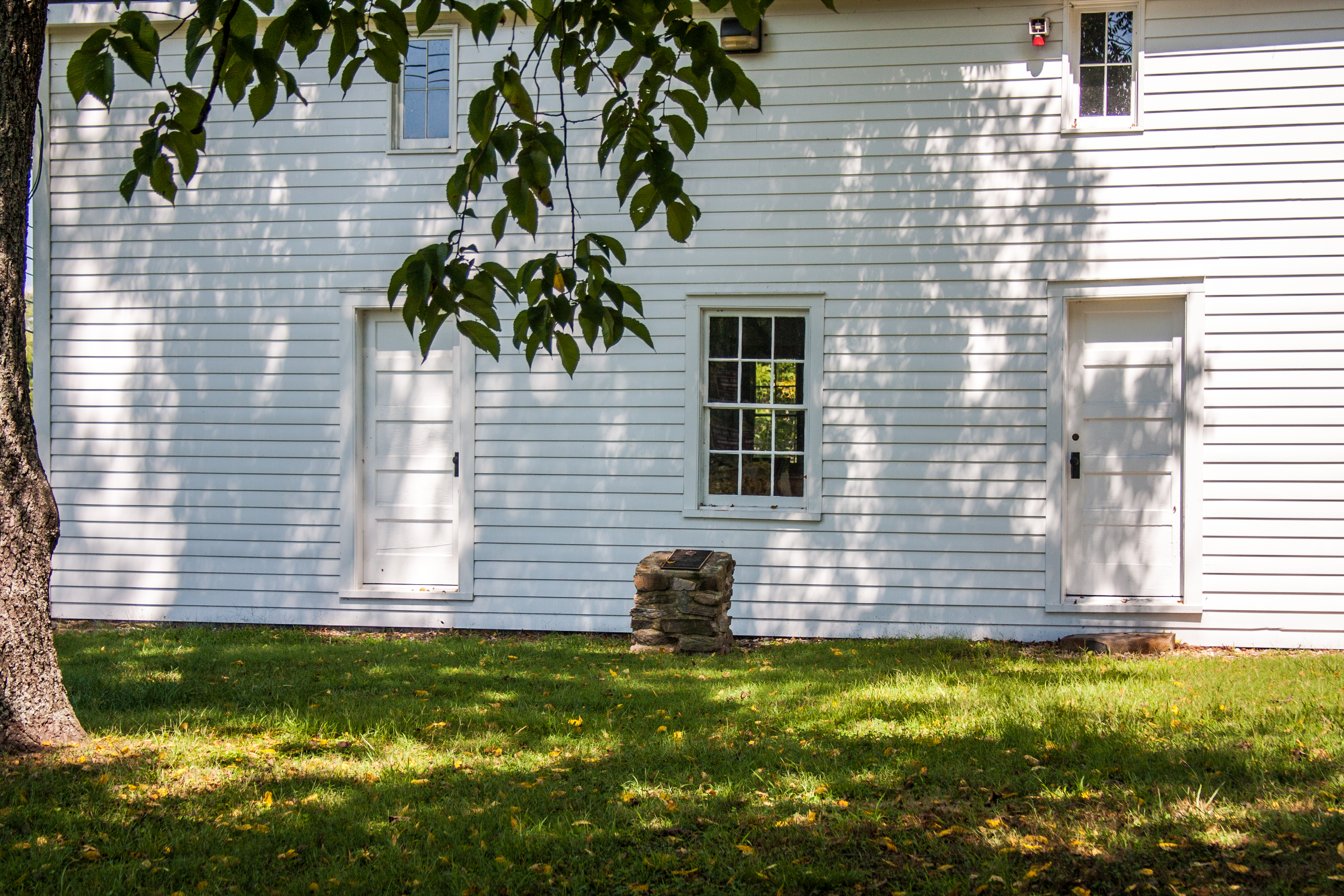

== See also ==
- Frying Pan Meetinghouse, nearby, also NRHP-listed
