= Frying Pan Farm Park =

Park Fairfax County, Virginia, U.S.

- Type: Historic and recreational
- Location: Fairfax County, Virginia, U.S.
- Nearest town: Herndon, Virginia
- Coordinates: 38°56′12.6″N 77°24′38.1″W
- Administered by: Fairfax County Park Authority
- Website: www.fairfaxcounty.gov/parks/frying-pan-park/

Frying Pan Farm Park is a park located in Fairfax County, Virginia. It has a variety of attractions of both a historic and recreational nature.

The park contains the Frying Pan Meetinghouse, listed on the National Register of Historic Places and dating from the 18th century, and the Old Floris Schoolhouse, constructed in 1911.

One of the attractions of the park is Kidwell Farm, a working demonstration farm. It recreates a 1930s farm and still has many animals including cows and horses. Frying Pan Farm Park hosts many equestrian events throughout the year at the Activities Center, featuring an indoor riding arena and two outside rings, and has a 4-H club.

For many years turkeys pardoned in the National Thanksgiving Turkey Presentation were sent to live at Frying Pan Farm Park.

According to the park's webpage, the area was known as Frying Pan from 1726 until 1892 when it was renamed to Floris; another source mentions a Frying Pan Springs, along with a story of the origin of both the Frying Pan (related to the nearby Coppermine) and Floris names.

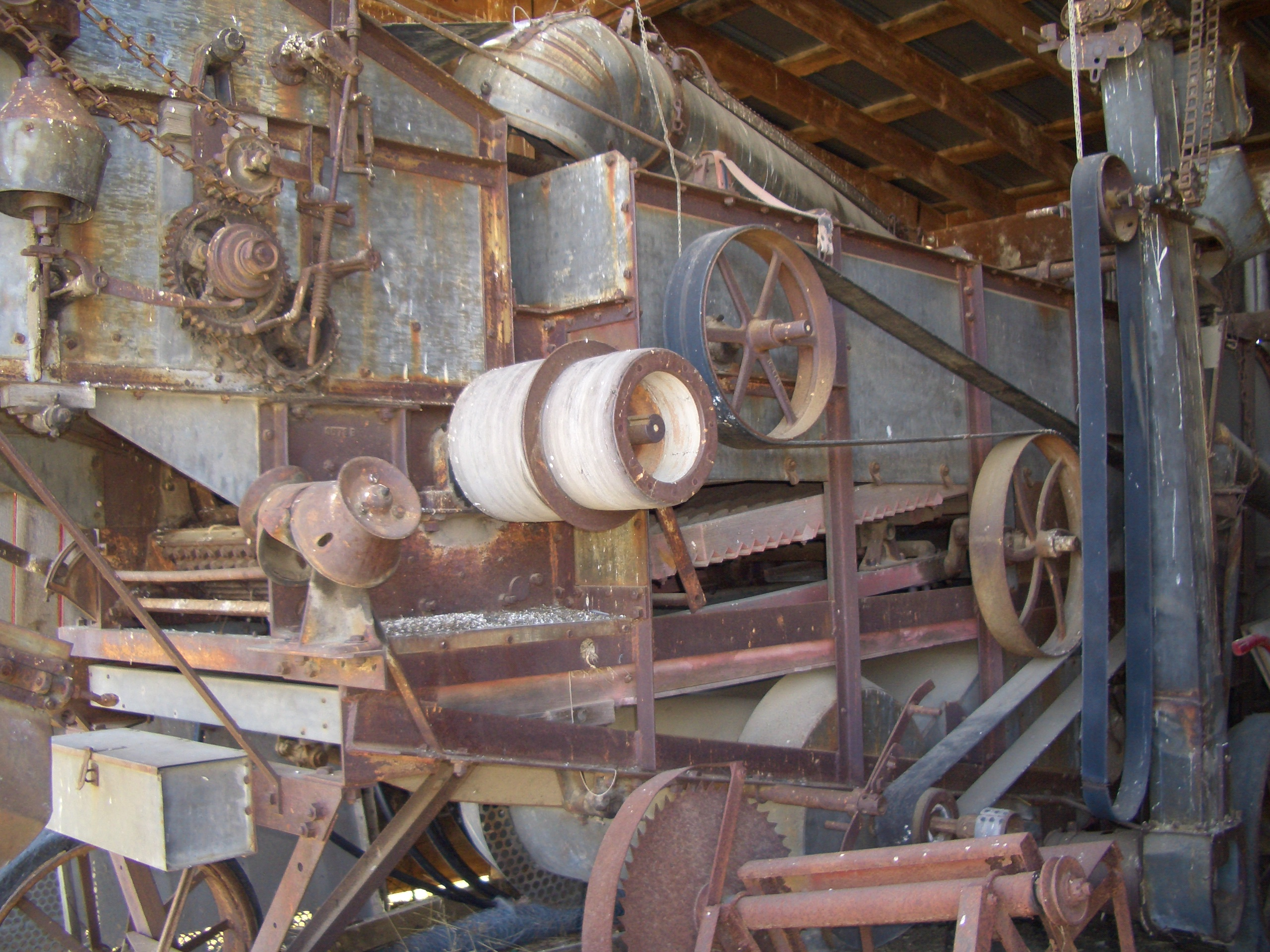
Threshing machine at Kidwell Farm

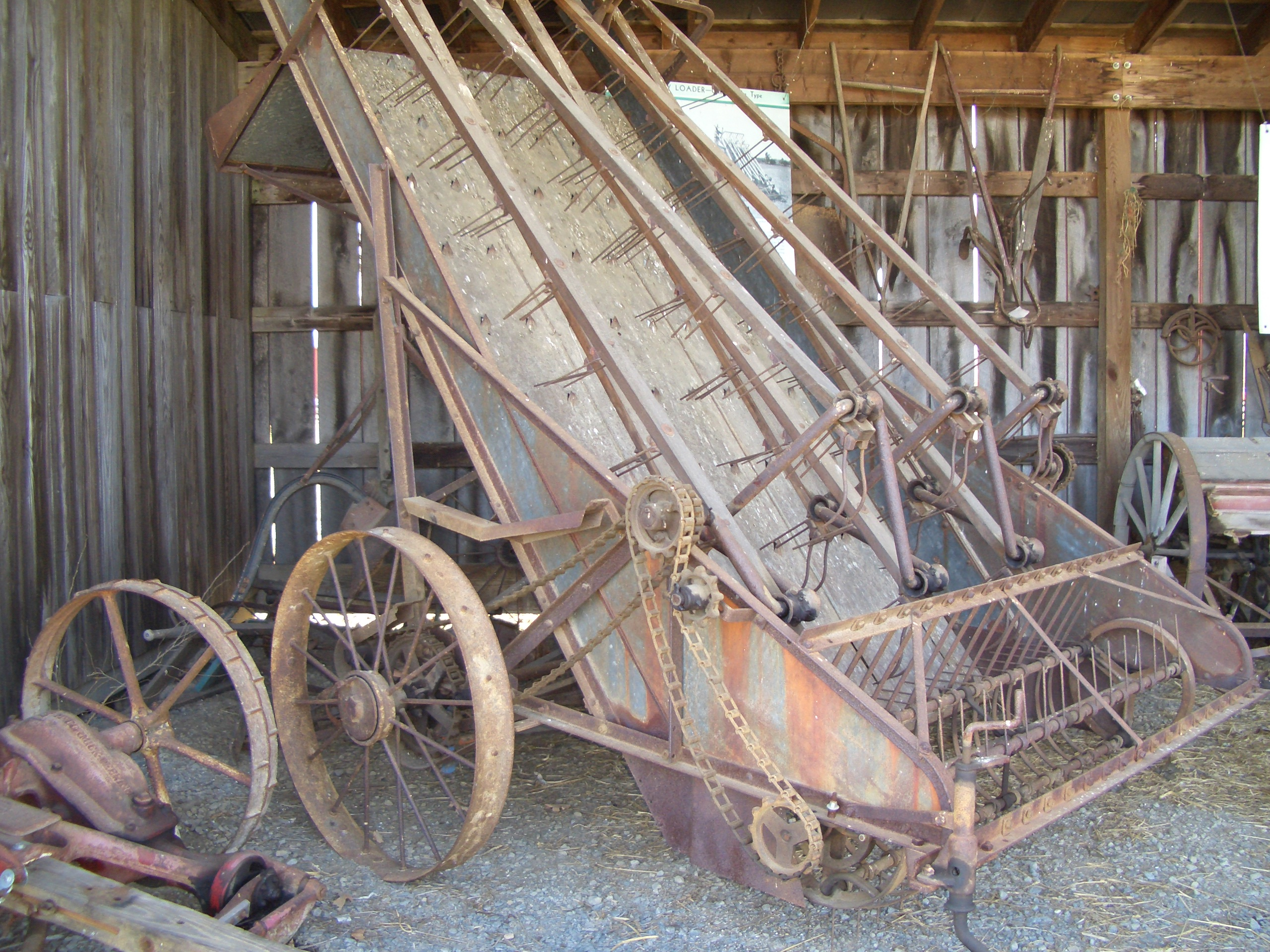
Hay loader at Kidwell Farm

== See also ==
- Merrybrook
