= Frying Pan Meetinghouse =

Historic church in Virginia, United States

- U.S. National Register of Historic Places
- Virginia Landmarks Register
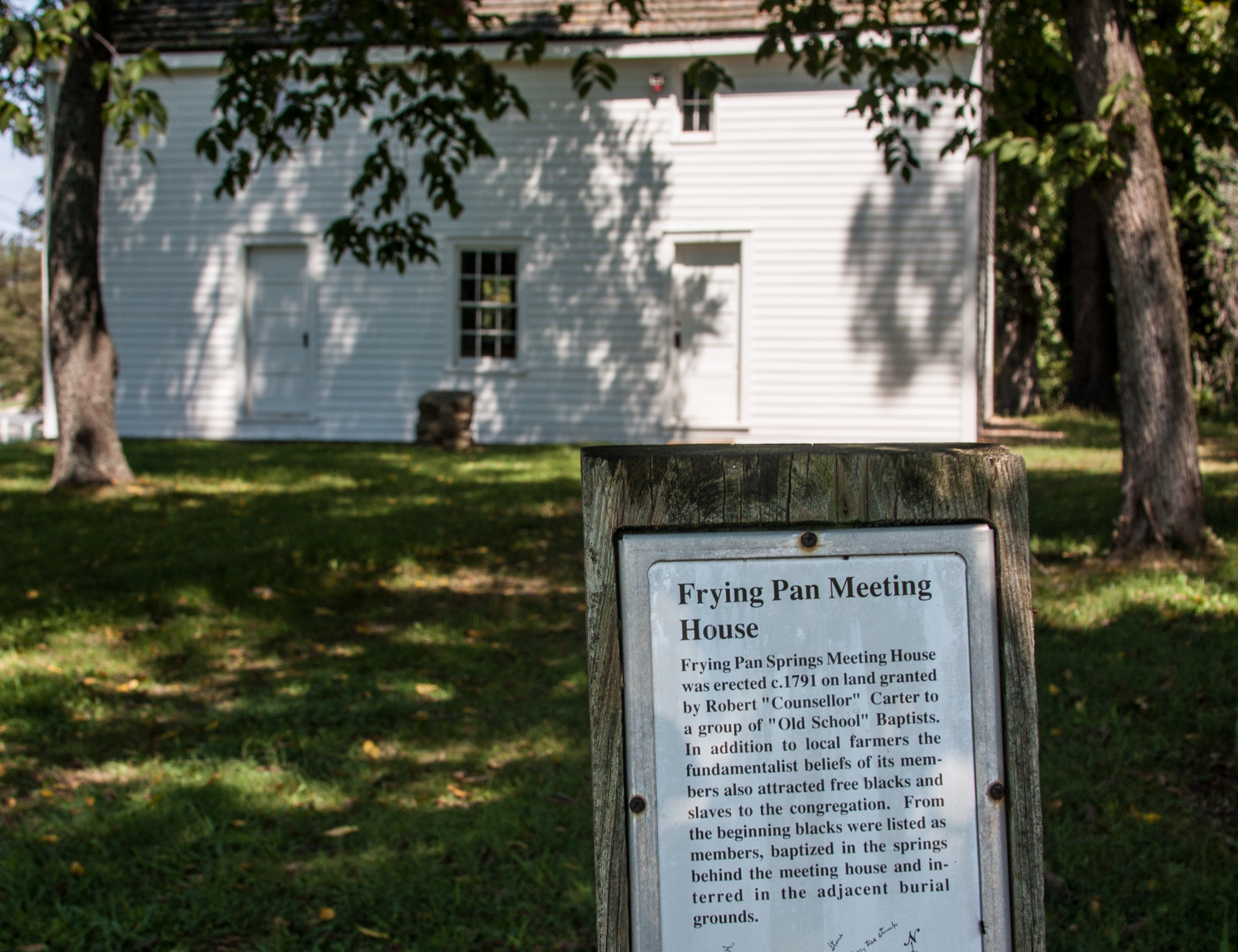
- View from the south

- Location within Northern Virginia Location within Virginia Location within the United States
- Location: 2615 Centreville Rd., Floris, Virginia
- Coordinates: 38°56′24″N 77°24′48″W
- NRHP reference No.: 91000016
- VLR No.: 029-0015

Significant dates
- Added to NRHP: February 5, 1991
- Designated VLR: December 11, 1990

The Frying Pan Meetinghouse (also known as Frying Pan Old School Baptist Church (1832) or Frying Pan Spring Meeting House) is a historic church building within Frying Pan Farm Park in Floris, Virginia.

It was built in 1791 as a church building. In 1984 the last remaining trustee deeded the building to the Fairfax County Park Authority to preserve and maintain the property. The building and cemetery were added to the National Register of Historic Places in 1991.

== See also ==
- Floris Historic District, nearby, NRHP-listed, containing Frying Pan Farm Park
