= Albert Ando =

American economist

Albert K. Ando
- アルバート安藤
- Born: 15 November 1929; Tokyo, Japan
- Died: 19 September 2002 (aged 72); United States
- Citizenship: American

Academic background
- Education: Seattle University (B.S.); St. Louis University (M.S.); Carnegie Mellon University (PhD)
- Doctoral advisor: Franco Modigliani
- Influences: Herbert A. Simon

Academic work
- Discipline: Mathematical economics
- Institutions: University of Pennsylvania
- Doctoral students: Stephen Goldfeld; Stephen Resnick; William Oakland
- Website: Information at IDEAS / RePEc

Albert K. Ando (アルバート安藤; 15 November 1929 – 19 September 2002) was a Japanese-born economist.

== Biography ==
He was born in Tokyo, as a member of family running Ando Corporation, a major construction company. He didn't join the family business, and came to the United States after World War II. He received his B.S. in economics from the Seattle University in 1951, his M.A. in economics from St. Louis University in 1953, and an M.S. in economics in 1956 and a PhD in mathematical economics in 1959 from Carnegie Institute of Technology (now Carnegie Mellon University). At Carnegie Mellon he collaborated, among others, with Herbert A. Simon on questions regarding aggregation and causation in economic systems and with Franco Modigliani on the life cycle analysis of saving, spending, and income.

Albert Ando was a tenured professor of economics and finance at the University of Pennsylvania from 1967 until his death from leukemia in 2002.

== Awards and fellowships ==
- Ford Foundation Faculty Research Fellow, 1970
- Japan Foundation Fellow
- Alexander von Humboldt Award for Senior American Scientists
- Guggenheim Fellow, 1970.
- Fellow, Econometric Society, elected 1966.
- Alexander Henderson Award, 1955.
