= William L. Silber =

American academic

William L. Silber is a former chaired professor at The Stern School of Business, New York University, most recently as the Marcus Nadler Professor of Finance and Economics (2002–2019) and before that as the Abraham Gitlow Professor of Economics and Finance (1990–2002). He has served as Senior Economist with the President's Council of Economic Advisors, was a member of the Economic Advisory Panel of the Federal Reserve Bank of New York, and has published eight books, including a college textbook, Principles of Money, Banking and Financial Markets, with Lawrence Ritter and Gregory Udell (Addison Wesley, 2009), that has gone through twelve editions. His most notable contributions have been in monetary economics, finance, and economic history, where he has shown the importance of analyzing institutional detail before applying statistical techniques to historical data. His analysis has also drawn on his work in the business world. He traded options and futures contracts on the Commodity Exchange and the New York Mercantile Exchange and he was a portfolio manager at the hedge fund Odyssey Partners.

== Biography ==
Silber holds a bachelor's degree (1963) from Yeshiva University, and an M.A. (1965) and Ph.D. (1966) from Princeton University; He was voted Professor of the Year by NYU Stern MBA students in 1990, 1997, and 2018 and was awarded NYU's Distinguished Teaching Medal in 1999. He and his wife endowed the Lillian F. and William L. Silber Professor of the Year Award at Yeshiva University, three annual cash gifts awarded to Yeshiva College, Stern College, and Sy Syms Business School faculty members that students select for special recognition.

== Books ==
Silber's study of the four-month closing of the New York Stock Exchange at the outbreak of World War I, When Washington Shut Down Wall Street: The Great Financial Crisis of 1914 and the Origins of America's Monetary Supremacy (Princeton University Press, 2007), was discussed in the Economic History Review by financial historian Hugh Rockoff: "One of the great strengths of the book is that while it never loses sight of the major issues—the rise of New York as the world's leading financial centre, crisis management, and so on—it also explains the workings of the financial sector in convincing detail. Every postgraduate student of economics and finance, and many of their academics, would benefit from reading these sections and seeing how the financial series to which we apply our econometric skills actually arise from the actions of real people coping on a daily basis with problems that appear to them to be unprecedented."

In Harvard's Business History Review, Maury Klein writes: "Few writers have paid much attention to the closing of the Exchange, except as a curiosity exemplifying the shock experienced by Americans when the war came. Silber has done historians a favor by placing that event in a context that reveals its broader significance. The war transformed the United States from a debtor to a creditor nation and elevated it to the position of dominant industrial power in the world. The gold standard returned to haunt the tangled web of international relations during the 1920s and 1930s. Several scholars have pointed to gold as the root source of the depression that blighted the economies of different nations at different times. All these complex events take on a greater clarity when illuminated by Silber's portrayal of their starting point. Nobel Laureate Milton Friedman wrote, "This book addresses an important issue that deserves wide readership. It is lucid and clear and deals with some very important episodes in American history."

Silber's biography of former Federal Reserve Chairman Paul A. Volcker, Volcker: The Triumph of Persistence (Bloomsbury, 2012), also emphasizes the importance of institutional detail. According to Stanford Professor John Taylor, "Mr. Silber offers fascinating subplots and revelations along the way—not to mention a portrait of a tough and colorful man—but his main storyline concerns two of the most dramatic-policy changes in economic history, one international, the other domestic. Mr. Volcker played a key role in both." The Volcker biography was named the China Business News (CBN) 2013 Financial Book of the Year, was a finalist in the Goldman Sachs / Financial Times 2012 Business Book of the Year Award, was named an "Editor's Choice" by the New York Times, was named "One of the Best Business Books of 2012" by Bloomberg Businessweek, and was listed as "One of 2012's Great Leadership Books" by the Washington Post. Neil Irwin wrote in the Washington Post, "William L. Silber has written a rich and detailed new biography of a man who has left as deep an imprint on the world economy as anyone of his generation."

His 2019 book, The Story of Silver: How the White Metal Shaped America and the Modern World (Princeton University Press), was named by the Financial Times as one of the "Best Books of 2019: History." James Grant described the book in the Wall Street Journal as follows: "The Story of Silver is the biography of America's first monetary metal. Biography is the word, as William Silber's colorful narrative is one of personalities as much as it is of ideas and events. Like gold, silver can preoccupy its fans to the point of obsession, as it did the Hunt brothers, Texas inflation-phobes who lost a fortune in 1980 by betting on silver and therefore against Paul Volcker, then chairman of the Federal Reserve, and Mr. Volcker's sky-high interest rates.". The Wharton School's Peter Conti-Brown in the Business History Review wrote: "The Story of Silver is a wonderful, broad book, full of verve and insight into why various generations―from Queen Elizabeth I to Warren Buffett, Alexander Hamilton to, especially, the infamous Hunt brothers―have been so focused on this slippery stuff." Gary Richardson, a faculty research associate at the National Bureau of Economic Research, added "Nothing this entertaining has been written on the topic since Frank Baum penned The Wizard of Oz as a monetary allegory."

His latest book, The Power of Nothing to Lose: The Hail Mary Effect in Politics, War, and Business, (Morrow / Harper, 2021) shows how presidents, generals, dictators, and ordinary people have used the power of downside protection to alter history. A simple strategy, similar to the Hail Mary pass in football, encourages risky ventures that favor the ‘deciders' but hurts innocent bystanders, causing collateral damage that requires attention. According to Thomas Sargent, Nobel Laureate in Economics, "Silber has a great eye for forces that have driven important decisions in history. This book weaves together gripping accounts of risky behavior by politicians, generals, and business leaders, and how they impacted society in surprising ways. I couldn't put this book down." Hoover Institution Senior Fellow Niall Ferguson wrote: "As Bill Silber shows in this enthralling and entertaining book--which I devoured in a single sitting--all kinds of people through history have acted recklessly in the belief that they had nothing to lose, from second-term presidents pardoning crooked cronies to quarter-backs throwing Hail Mary passes." Kirkus Review described it as "A brisk look at times when it pays off to take a chance."

== Bibliography ==
- William L. Silber (2012). Volcker: The Triumph of Persistence. Bloomsbury USA. ISBN 978-1-60819-070-6.
- William L. Silber (2014). When Washington Shut Down Wall Street: The Great Financial Crisis of 1914 and the Origins of America's Monetary Supremacy. Princeton University Press. ISBN 978-1-4008-5166-9.
- William L. Silber (2019). The Story of Silver: How the White Metal Shaped America and the Modern World. Princeton University Press. ISBN 978-0-6911-7538-6.
- William L. Silber (2021). The Power of Nothing to Lose: The Hail Mary Effect in Politics, War, and Business. William Morrow An imprint of HarperCollins Publishers. ISBN 978-0-06-301152-6.
