= Andrea Levin =

Former CAMERA executive director

Andrea Levin is the former executive director of the Committee for Accuracy in Middle East Reporting and Analysis (formerly Committee for Accuracy in the Middle East Reporting in America), a pro-Israel media watchdog nonprofit organization based in Boston. Levin was fired from CAMERA on May 7, 2025.

Born Andrea Nelson in 1945 in Manhattan, she grew up as an "Army brat", once taught English in the Philadelphia public schools before moving to Boston where she worked at Harvard Kennedy School as an associate editor of the Journal of Policy Analysis and Management.

== CAMERA ==
Levin's involvement in CAMERA began in 1988 when she wrote an article for the Boston-area weekly The Tab critical of the Boston Globe's coverage of the First Intifada. In an interview in 2003, she told the Globe, "I was not very acquainted with the established Jewish community," but began receiving calls after her piece was published.

Levin, a former associate editor of the Journal of Policy Analysis and Management, has been quoted on the issue of media bias in various sources.

Levin told an interviewer, "I think pro-Israeli media watching has an importance beyond the cause of Israel. Efforts that induce better adherence to ethical journalism in one subject area are positive generally in helping to strengthen American democracy, especially, again, as there are no enforceable codes of professional conduct in the media."

=== Criticism ===
In a 2001 article titled "Ha'aretz Fuels Anti-Israel Bias" Levin wrote that some Haaretz reporters are guilty of sacrificing factual accuracy on the altar of political convictions. Levin specifically referred to reporter Amira Hass, who she said was made to pay $60,000 to the Jewish community of Hebron after an inaccurate report. Other Haaretz contributors singled out by Levin included Gideon Levy, Akiva Eldar and Baruch Kimmerling.

In 2002 Levin stated that while Israel has capable spokesmen, it does not conduct its publicity effectively.

Levin criticized CNN after the network aired a documentary called God's Warriors in 2007. She described the show's premise as false "from the start."

In an op-ed for The Jerusalem Post in 2010, Levin criticized The New York Times after Times Jerusalem bureau chief Ethan Bronner made statements on MSNBC accusing the Israeli public of prejudice and racism in relation to its views toward Barack Obama. In the same op-ed, Levin accused B'Tselem of characterizing terrorists as civilians.

== Publications ==
- Bearing False Witness: Jimmy Carter's "Palestine: Peace Not Apartheid" by Andrea Levin, Alex Safian, and Gilead Ini

== See also ==
- Commentary on Palestine: Peace Not Apartheid
