= Laura Ratcliffe =

American Civil War spy

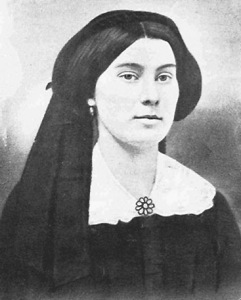
- Born: Laura Ratcliffe; April 28, 1836; Fairfax, Virginia, U.S.
- Died: August 3, 1923 (aged 87); Herndon, Virginia
- Spouse: Milton Hanna (m. 1890–1897)
- Espionage activity
- Allegiance: Confederate States of America

Laura Ratcliffe (March 28, 1836, in Fairfax, Virginia – August 3, 1923, in Herndon, Virginia) was a Confederate States of America spy. Laura's home in Herndon was sometimes used as a headquarters by the Confederate raider John Mosby. Mosby gave Laura thousands of Federal Greenbacks to hide in her home. She warned him when Union troops came looking for him, saving his life. Laura Ratcliffe was also a friend of Major General J. E. B. Stuart, who gave her several gifts in "appreciation of her patriotism, admiration of her virtues, and pledge of his lasting esteem.". They had met after Ratcliffe had served as a nurse in Jeb Stuart's Camp Quivive in Fairfax in the winter of 1861.

== Gifts for Laura ==
Stuart gave Laura an album and his watch chain. The album given to Laura contains four poems, two that Stuart wrote, and two that he copied to ensure Laura would gather information for him. It also contained forty signatures, twenty-six from Confederate soldiers, and fourteen from civilians. The album itself is a mystery because there are no dates of when it was signed or where, but author Charles V. Mauro assumes that it was kept hidden in Laura's house and signed during the Civil War. It is also possible that Stuart sent the album to Laura before leaving Northern Virginia in early March. The poems inside the album are considered to be “love” poems to Laura because of the way they were written, but yet Stuart married Flora Cooke in 1855. He also gave Laura his watch chain with a gold dollar attached to it. Like the album, Stuart hoped that this gift would be enough to keep Laura spying for Mosby.

== After the war ==
Though Laura and her sister, Cora, were impoverished due to the war, they inherited a home in 1873. Back in 1869, Laura's mother sold her 133 acres she owned near Burke Lake, and on July 2, 1869, she bought a house called Merrybrook. Laura's mother left all of her properties to Laura and Cora in her will on October 31, 1873. In 1890, at age fifty-five, Laura got married for the first time. She married a man named Milton Hanna, a wealthy Union veteran, who coincidentally was her neighbor and friend. Sadly, seven years after their marriage, Milton was killed in an unfortunate farming accident. Because of Milton's death, Laura was now in charge of, not only her holding but his properties as well which made Laura a very wealthy woman. She used her inheritance to help the poor and local churches. In 1910, she was seventy-four at the time, ninety-six of Mosby's men held their annual reunion in Herndon where Congressman C. C. Carlin praised Laura by saying that she gave the guerilla leader very valuable information regarding the actions of Union troops.

== Injury, death, and commemoration ==
At age seventy-eight, in 1914, Laura went outside to feed her chickens and she slipped on a flat piece of stone. Though her injury was not examined by a doctor, she broke her hip. Laura spent the next nine years of her life in bed and died at the age of eighty-seven on August 8, 1923. While on her deathbed, she still had servants on her dairy farm who took care of her, and visitors described her as gracious and, strangely, wore little earrings. Even dying, Laura remained cheerful and interested in her community. She was buried on her property in Herndon in a small family plot with her mother and husband. Merrybrook, her house, is now one of the only antebellum homes to remain standing after real estate developments in Herndon. Merrybrook is now listed on the National Register of Historic Places, and, in addition to that, a historical Virginia highway marker was made to honor Laura Ratcliffe. This highway marker is located on Route 228 near her grave. About two miles out from the highway marker is another marker that describes Mosby's Rock.

== Sources ==
- Bakeless, John. Spies of the Confederacy. Courier Corporation, 1997, https://books.google.com/books?id=Bf8kAwAAQBAJ
- Frank, Lisa. Women in the American Civil War: Volume 1. ABC-CLIO, 2008, https://books.google.com/books?id=X2GeBUmW_MgC&q=how+did+Laura+Ratcliffe+become+a+spy.&pg=PA469
- Mauro, Charles. A Southern Spy in Northern Virginia: The Civil War Album of Laura Ratcliffe. History Press, 2009, https://books.google.com/books?id=5Xl0CQAAQBAJ
- Winkler, Donald. Stealing Secrets: How a Few Daring Women Deceived Generals, Impacted Battles, and Altered the Course of the Civil War. Cumberland House, 2010, https://books.google.com/books?id=J-feCgAAQBAJ
