= David I. Meiselman =

American economist

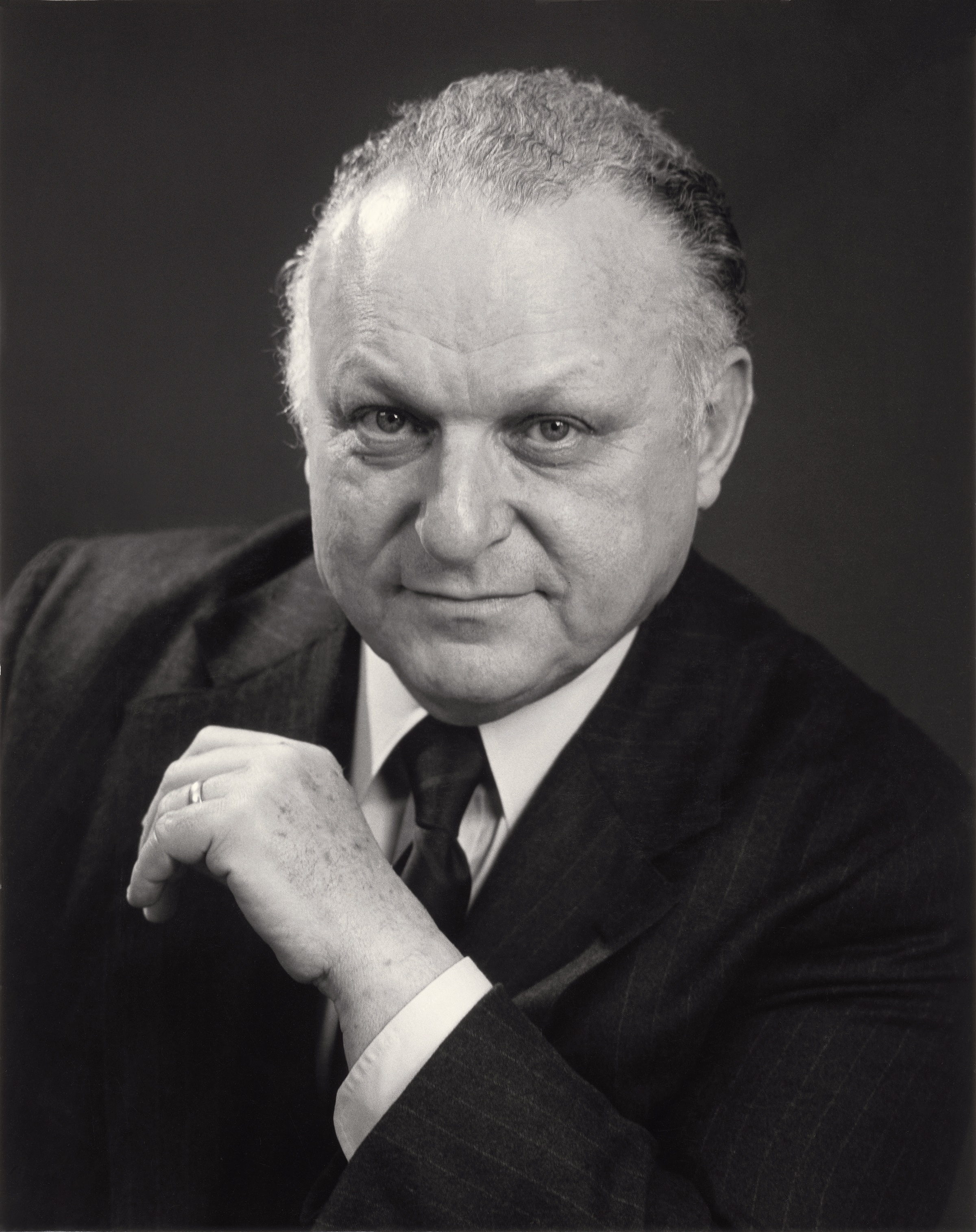
- Meiselman in January 1979
- Born: 1924; Boston, Massachusetts, U.S.
- Died: December 3, 2014 (aged 89–90); Baltimore, Maryland, U.S.
- Education: University of Chicago (MA, PhD); Boston University (BA)
- Spouse: Winifred Meiselman
- Scientific career
- Fields: Economics
- Thesis: The Term Structure of Interest Rates (1962)
- Doctoral advisor: Milton Friedman

David I. Meiselman (/ˈmaɪzəlmən/; 1924 – December 3, 2014) was an American economist. Among his contributions to the field of economics are his work on the term structure of interest rates, the foundation today of the implementation of monetary policy by major central banks, and his work with Milton Friedman on the impact of monetary policy on the performance of the economy and inflation.

== Early life and education ==
Meiselman was born in Boston, Massachusetts. He completed his B.A. in economics at Boston University in 1947, and his M.A. in economics in 1951 from the University of Chicago. He received his Ph.D. in economics from the University of Chicago in 1961 for his thesis "The Term Structure of Interest Rates" for which he received The Ford Foundation Doctoral Dissertation Series award.

Meiselman married Winifred Meiselman in 1965.

== Work history ==
- Economist in Office of Financial Analysis, U.S. Department of the Treasury, 1962–63
- Senior economist, Committee on Banking and Currency, for the U.S. House of Representatives, 1963
- Senior economist, Organization of American States, Inter-American Development Bank Fiscal Mission to Peru, 1964
- Senior economist and associate editor, National Banking Review, Office of the Comptroller of the Currency, U.S. Treasury Dept. 1964–66
- Senior consultant, International Bank for Reconstructions and Development, 1966
- Consultant, U.S. Secretary of the Treasury, 1969–1977
- Consultant, New York Stock Exchange
- Consultant, World Bank
- Financial Economist, Oppenheimer & Co.

== Teaching ==
- Assistant Professor, Department of Economics, University of Chicago, 1958–1962
- Visiting Faculty, Johns Hopkins University, 1963–1964
- Visiting professor of economics, University of Minnesota, 1966–1968
- Frederick R. Bigelow Professor of Economics and Director, Bureau of Economic Studies, Macalester College, 1966–1971
- Professor of Economics and Director of the Graduate Economics Program in Northern Virginia, Virginia Polytechnic Institute (now Virginia Tech), 1971–1997
- Associate Director of Virginia Tech's Center for the Study of the Economics and Regulation of Futures and Options Markets, 1989–1997
- Research associate, Center for Study of Public Choice, Virginia Polytechnic Institute, 1971–1983

== Board memberships and affiliations ==
- Vice president, Southern Economic Association, 1981–82
- President, Philadelphia Society, 1973–1975
- Executive Committee, Banking, Monetary and Fiscal Affairs Committee, U.S. Chamber of Commerce, 1980-1990s
- Founder and former member of the board of directors of the Manhattan Institute for Policy Research, 1977–1986
- Adjunct scholar, The Heritage Foundation
- Adjunct scholar, Cato Institute
- Adjunct scholar, American Enterprise Institute
- Commodity Futures Trading Commission, Financial Products Advisory Committee, 1985–1997
- Distinguished Research Scholar at the Center for the Study of Public Choice, George Mason University

== Work ==
Meiselman's key contributions to economic research include his dissertation, "The Term Structure of Interest Rates" (1962), and his collaborative study with Milton Friedman, "The Relative Stability of Monetary Velocity and the Investment Multiplier in the United States, 1897-1958" (1963).

Meiselman's archive was bequeathed to George Mason University Libraries and is held in their Special Collection Research Center.

=== Term structure ===
Meiselman's thesis "The Term Structure of Interest Rates" integrated evidence from cash markets and futures markets into a unified theory of how interest rates may behave over time. He documented empirically that the markets are forward looking, and demonstrated the relationship between short-term and long term interest rates, the link being forward short-term rates based on the path of expected short-term interest rates over the maturity of the expected long-term asset. This framework is widely used by analysts in dealing with term structure issues, and is the framework used by central banks in the implementation of their policies aimed at affecting aggregate spending through the level of long-term interest rates.

This contribution was made at a time when economists had come to attach growing importance to the role of expectations and the expectations-formation process to a variety of key types of economic behavior. It was becoming commonplace to view consumption as based on permanent or life-cycle income instead of only current income, unemployment as dependent on inflation expectations, and business investment as dependent on expected path of sales and profits. In the financial realm, share prices were viewed as being based on expected earnings and fixed-income prices as dependent on expectations of short-term interest rates. Translating these concepts into operationally tractable measures required that the expectations formation process be specified. Meiselman articulated this in the term structure realm using an error-learning process.

=== Impact of monetary vs. fiscal policy ===
His empirical studies with Milton Friedman in the early 1960s indicated a greater role of the money supply over investment and government spending on inflation. Up to the time of this report, the widespread belief among economists was that fiscal policy was a much more effective stabilization tool than monetary policy.

=== Influence on policy ===
In 1968, Meiselman was asked by Richard Nixon's presidential campaign to chair a task force on inflation. This Task Force focused on inflation as being caused by overly expansive monetary policy, and prescribed setting limits on monetary growth.

A decade passed before Congress took action to clarify the goals of monetary policy and to increase accountability. Acknowledging that inflation was caused by monetary forces, the Humphrey-Hawkins Full Employment Act specified the dual mandate of stable prices and maximum employment as the primary goals of monetary policy.

While the role of the monetary aggregates in the conduct of monetary policy has diminished a great deal over recent decades owing to a pronounced deterioration in the predictability of monetary velocity, the focus on the Fed as the entity responsible for inflation has, if anything, intensified. The Fed, in recognition of this responsibility, has set a target for low inflation—2 percent per year. In other words, there is no longer a battle over the causes of inflation and responsibility for keeping inflation low. The monetarists, of which Meiselman was a key member, prevailed, but the methods being used by central banks have evolved from achieving price stability through monetary aggregates to pursuing this goal through other means.

Beyond monetary policy, Meiselman made contributions to policy in the areas of futures contracts, debt management, and taxes. His policy recommendations respected the role of market-driven processes as solutions to problems facing the economy, and he was highly skeptical of governmental involvement in the economic sphere.

== Publications ==
Books

- Meiselman, David I. (1978). Welfare reform and the Carter public service employment program a critique. Coral Gables, FL: Law and Economics Center, University of Miami School of Law. ISBN 978-0916770051.
- Meiselman, edited by David I.; Laffer, Arthur B. (1975). The Phenomenon of worldwide inflation (2. pr. ed.). Washington: American Enterprise Institute for Public Policy Research. ISBN 978-0844720586.
- Meiselman, David I., ed. (1970). Varieties of Monetary Experience. University of Chicago Press.
- Meiselman, David I.; Shapiro, Eli (1964). The Measurement of Corporate Sources and Uses of Funds. National Bureau of Economic Research.
- Meiselman, David (1962). The term structure of interest rates. Englewood Cliffs, NJ: Prentice Hall. p. 75.

Articles

- Meiselman, David I. (March 1994). "Should the Federal Reserve System Be Reformed?". National Association of Business Economists NEWS (104).
- Meiselman, David I. (March 16, 1995). "Accountability and Responsibility in the Conduct of Monetary Policy - Mandating a Stable Price Level Rule". Statement to the Joint Economic Committee, U.S. Congress, Hearings on the Humphrey-Hawkins Act.
- Meiselman, David (1963). "Bond Yields and the Price Level: The Gibson Paradox Regained". Banking and Monetary Studies.
- Friedman, Milton; Meiselman, David (1963). "The Relative Stability of Monetary Velocity and the Investment Multiplier in the United States". Stabilization Policies: 165–268.
- Meiselman, David I. (October 1993). "Uncertainty and the Real Effects of Discretionary Monetary Policy: Why Forecasts Fail". Economic Policy, Financial Markets, and Economic Growth.
- Meiselman, David I. (April 1993). "Health Insurance Derivatives: The Newest Application of Modern Financial Risk Management". Business Economics. XXVll (2).
- Meiselman, David I. (September 1992). "Is Regulation of Insider Trading in Futures Markets Necessary?". Regulatory Review and Reform of the Futures Lndustry.
- Meiselman, David I. (1992). "The Rational Expectations - New Classical Macroeconomics Revolution". Cato Journal. 12 (1).
- Meiselman, David I. (August 1991). "'The Collapse of Deposit Insurance: From Apparent Success to Clear Disaster". Durell Journal of Money and Banking. Ill (3).
- Meiselman, David I. (1990). "Don't Blame the Messenger for the Message". Annual Report of NYMEX.
- Meiselman, David I. (1990). "Mutual Fund Banking". Cato Journal.
- Meiselman, David I. (1988). "The Stock Market Crash and the Economic Outlook". Baruch College, City University of New York.
- Meiselman, David I. (1987). "Is Gold the Answer?" in The Search for Stable Money: Essays on Monetary Reform. Univ of Chicago Press. ISBN 978-0226158303.
- Meiselman, David (April 1987). "Is Inflation Really Dead?". Policy Working Pagers, U.S. Chamber of Commerce (2).

== See also ==
- Monetarism
