= John Foust =

American politician

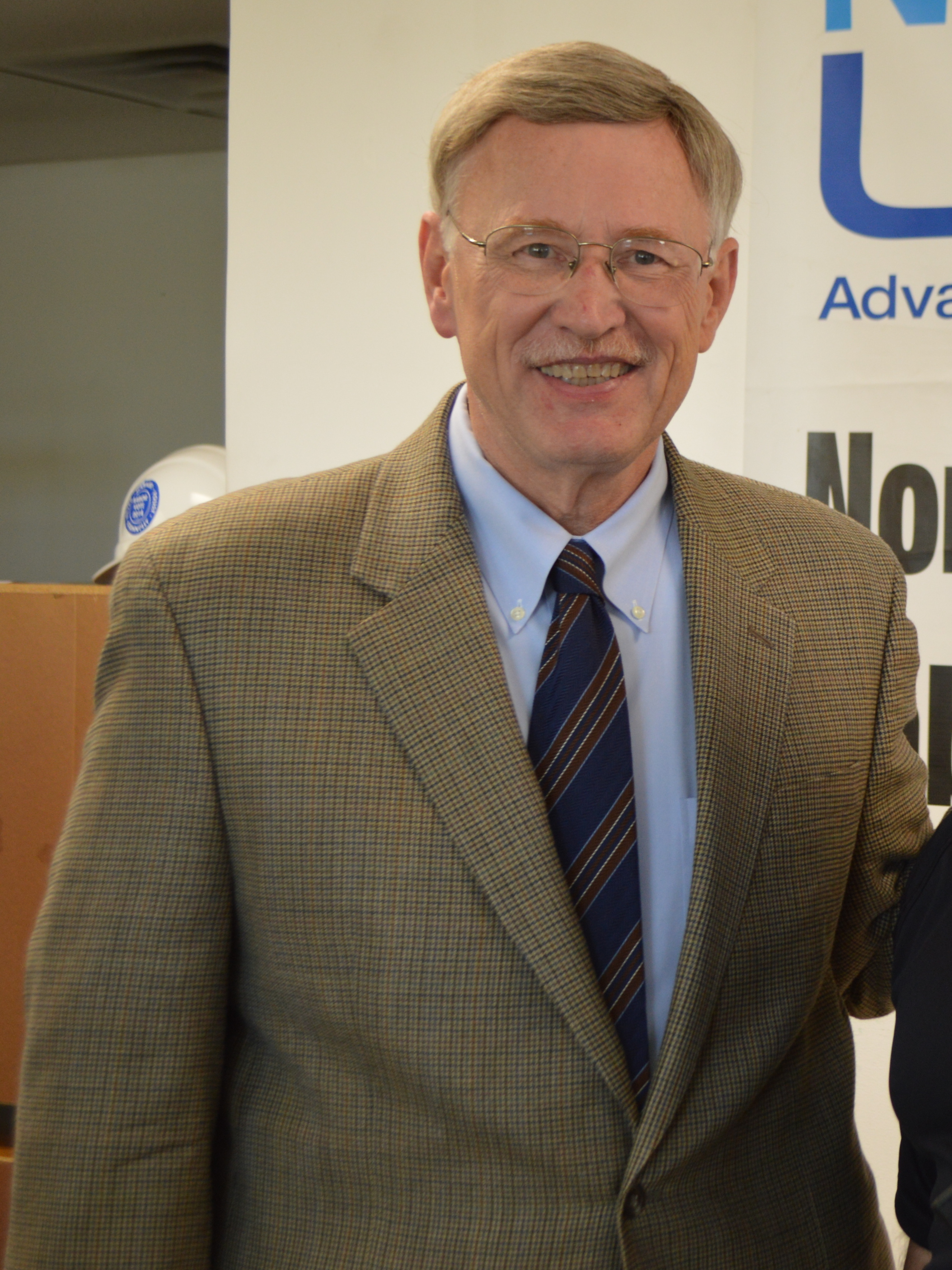

Member of the Fairfax County Board of Supervisors from the Dranesville district
- In office 2008–2023
- Preceded by: Joan M. DuBois
- Succeeded by: James N. "Jimmy" Bierman

Personal details
- Born: John William Foust; September 5, 1951 (age 74) Johnstown, Pennsylvania, U.S.
- Party: Democratic
- Spouse: Marilyn Jerome Foust
- Children: 2
- Education: University of Pittsburgh; George Washington University Law School (JD)
- Occupation: Lawyer

John William Foust (born September 5, 1951) is an American politician who served as a member of the Fairfax County, Virginia Board of Supervisors for the Dranesville district from 2008 to 2023. The district includes McLean, Great Falls, Herndon and portions of Vienna and Falls Church. Foust made an unsuccessful bid as the 2014 Democratic candidate for Virginia's 10th congressional district in the U.S. Congress, which he lost by a margin of roughly 16% to Republican Barbara Comstock.

== Personal life and education ==
Foust grew up in Johnstown, Pennsylvania, the oldest of five brothers. After graduating from Bishop McCort High School in Johnstown, he became the first person in his family to attend college and earned a bachelor's degree in economics from the University of Pittsburgh in 1973. To pay for his education, he worked each summer as a laborer in the steel mills and on the railroad tracks. Foust earned an M.B.A. from the West Virginia College of Graduate Studies in 1976, and a J.D. degree from George Washington University Law School in 1981.

In 1984, John married Dr. Marilyn Jerome, a partner in Foxhall Ob-Gyn Associates in Washington, D.C. They have two sons, Matthew, a graduate of Vanderbilt University's Peabody College of Education and Patrick, a graduate of the Georgetown University Walsh School of Foreign Service.

== Career ==
After graduating from the University of Pittsburgh, Foust worked full-time for C&P Companies, performing and supervising economic, cost analysis, and regulatory studies. During this time, he attended night law school classes. He then practiced construction law in Northern Virginia until his election to the Board of Supervisors.

He served as the president of the McLean Citizens Association, and as chairman of the Environmental Quality Advisory Council's legislative committee. He also served as the chairman of the Chain Bridge District of the Boy Scouts of America.

Foust lost the June 1999 Democratic primary for the 34th District seat in the Virginia House of Delegates to Carole Herrick, who lost the November election to incumbent Republican Vincent F. Callahan Jr.

Foust ran against Republican Joan Dubois for the Dranesville District seat on the Fairfax County Board of Supervisors vacated by Stuart Mendelsohn in 2003, losing by 510 votes out of the over 23,000 cast. In a 2007 rematch, Foust defeated Dubois with 53.5% of the vote. He then won re-election against Dennis D. Husch in 2011. Foust won reelection to a third term on November 3, 2015, defeating his Republican opponent.

As a member of the Board of Supervisors, Foust serves as the chairman of the Board's Audit Committee and as Vice Chairman of the Board's Budget and Transportation Committees. In addition, Foust serves as Chairman of the Fairfax County Economic Advisory Commission and also serves on the Northern Virginia Transportation Commission, the Route 28 Transportation Improvement Commission, the Mosaic Community Development Authority, the Dulles Rail Phase I and Phase II Transportation Improvement District Commissions, the Metropolitan Washington Council of Governments, and the National Capital Region Emergency Preparedness Council.

He retired from the Board of Supervisors at the end of his term in January 2024.

== U.S. House campaign ==
Following the retirement announcement of Republican Frank Wolf, Foust ran for Congress unsuccessfully in Virginia's 10th congressional district in 2014.

Some endorsers of John Foust included the American Federation of Government Employees, The Human Rights Campaign, Everytown For Gun Safety, and the National Education Association.

During the campaign, Foust was criticized for saying of his opponent, Barbara Comstock, "I don't think she's even had a real job." When confronted in a TV interview about his comments, he said: "The problem is, those jobs were so hyper-partisan, and that was the point I was making."

== Electoral history ==
1999 Virginia State House District 34 Democratic Primary results
Party	Candidate	Votes	%
Democratic	Carole Loop Herrick	658	58.64
Democratic	John W. Foust	464	41.36

Fairfax County Supervisor: Dranesville, 2003
Party	Candidate	Votes	%	±%
Republican	Joan M DuBois	11,966	51.09	−8.61
Democratic	John W. Foust	11,456	48.91	+48.91

Fairfax County Supervisor: Dranesville, 2007
Party	Candidate	Votes	%	±%
Democratic	John W. Foust	13,067	53.49	+4.58
Republican	Joan M DuBois	11,318	46.33	−4.76

Fairfax County Supervisor: Dranesville, 2011
Party	Candidate	Votes	%	±%
Democratic	John W. Foust	15,222	60.63	+7.14
Republican	Dennis D Husch	9,857	39.26	−7.07

Member House of Representatives, Virginia 10th District 2014
Party	Candidate	Votes	%
Republican	Barbara J. Comstock	125,914	56.49
Democratic	John W. Foust	89,957	40.36
Libertarian	William B. Redpath	3,393	1.52
Independent	Brad A. Eickholt	2,442	1.1
Independent Greens	Dianne L. Blais	946	0.42

Fairfax County Supervisor: Dranesville, 2015
Party	Candidate	Votes	%	±%
Democratic	John W. Foust	15,007	54.26	−6.37
Republican	Jennifer Chronis	12,612	45.60	+6.34

Fairfax County Supervisor: Dranesville, 2019
Party	Candidate	Votes	%	±%
Democratic	John W. Foust	23,468	65.42	+11.16
Republican	Ed Martin	12,298	34.28	−11.32

== See also ==
- Fairfax County, Virginia
- Dranesville, Virginia
