= Women Who Work =

Women Who Work may refer to:

- Women Who Work (1938 film), an Argentine comedy film
- Women Who Work (1953 film), a Mexican drama film
- Women Who Work (book), a 2017 book by Ivanka Trump

== See also ==
- Women in the workforce
