= Barbara Comstock =

American politician (born 1959)

- Official portrait, 2015

Member of the U.S. House of Representatives from Virginia's 10th district
- In office January 3, 2015 – January 3, 2019
- Preceded by: Frank Wolf
- Succeeded by: Jennifer Wexton

Member of the Virginia House of Delegates from the 34th district
- In office January 13, 2010 – November 10, 2014
- Preceded by: Margaret Vanderhye
- Succeeded by: Kathleen Murphy

Personal details
- Born: Barbara Jean Burns; June 30, 1959 (age 67) Springfield, Massachusetts, U.S.
- Party: Republican
- Other political affiliations: Democratic (formerly)
- Spouse: Chip Comstock (m. 1982)
- Children: 3
- Education: Middlebury College (BA); Georgetown University (JD)

Barbara Jean Comstock (née Burns; born June 30, 1959) is an American politician and attorney who served as the U.S. representative for Virginia's 10th congressional district from 2015 to 2019. A member of the Republican Party, she previously served as a member of the Virginia House of Delegates from 2010 to 2014.

Comstock has worked in numerous positions for various government agencies, including as chief counsel of the House Government Reform and Oversight Committee, as director of public affairs at the Department of Justice and as a congressional staffer. In 2009, Comstock was elected to the Virginia House of Delegates.

In 2014, Comstock was elected to Congress, succeeding retiring Republican incumbent Frank Wolf. She lost re-election in 2018 to Jennifer Wexton.

In 2019, she joined the lobbying firm Baker Donelson as a senior advisor. Since leaving Congress, she has criticized Donald Trump, endorsing Kamala Harris and two Democratic congressional candidates in 2024. In 2025, she endorsed successful Democratic gubernatorial candidate Abigail Spanberger and lieutenant gubernatorial candidate Ghazala Hashmi against the Republican candidates, Winsome Earle-Sears and John Reid.

== Early life and education ==
Comstock was born Barbara Jean Burns in Springfield, Massachusetts, on June 30, 1959. She is the daughter of Sally Ann Burns, a teacher, and John Ferguson Burns, national manager of polymer sales for Shell Chemicals. Comstock graduated from Westchester High School in Houston, Texas, in 1977. She graduated cum laude from Middlebury College in 1981. In college, Comstock spent a semester interning for Senator Ted Kennedy. While interning for Kennedy, Comstock, who was raised a Democrat, became a Republican. Years later, she recalled that she had long reckoned herself as a Reagan Democrat, and during her internship she found herself agreeing more with Orrin Hatch of Utah than with Kennedy. She then attended law school at Georgetown University, graduating with a Juris Doctor degree in 1986.

== Career ==
After working as a lawyer in private practice, Comstock served from 1991 to 1995 as a senior aide to Congressman Frank Wolf. Comstock then served as chief investigative counsel and senior counsel for the U.S. House of Representatives Committee on Government Reform from 1995 to 1999, working as one of Washington's most prominent anti-Clinton opposition researchers.

Comstock worked on behalf of the 2000 presidential campaign of George W. Bush. Her research team built massive stores of paper and electronic data, known as "The Gore File", that were a key source of information on the former vice president for GOP publicists and ad-makers. Comstock is credited with writing the Republican "playbook" defending Bush nominees such as John Ashcroft for U.S. Attorney General. Comstock later served as director of public affairs for the Justice Department from 2002 to 2003.

Comstock and Barbara Olson, the wife of United States Solicitor General Theodore Olson, formed a partnership known to Washington insiders as the "Two Barbaras". Barbara Olson died in the September 11, 2001 terrorist attacks.

She was a founding partner and co-principal of the public relations firm Corallo Comstock.

Comstock joined law firm Blank Rome in 2004. Comstock assisted the defense teams of both Scooter Libby and former House Majority Leader Tom DeLay. In 2005, Comstock was hired by Dan Glickman to lobby on behalf of the Motion Picture Association of America. In 2008, Comstock was a consultant on the presidential campaign of Mitt Romney. Comstock is a former co-chair of the executive committee of the Susan B. Anthony List.

Prior to running for office, she was registered as a lobbyist.

=== Virginia House of Delegates ===
In 2009, Comstock was elected to a seat in the Virginia House of Delegates. She defeated incumbent Democrat Margaret Vanderhye by 316 votes. While in the state legislature, Comstock was involved in enacting legislation that increased the penalties for teen sex trafficking.

Comstock's public relations firm consulted for the Workforce Fairness Institute (WFI), a conservative group advocating on a variety of federal labor policy issues, from 2008 through 2012. According to a 2014 report by Politico, during her time in the Virginia House of Delegates, Comstock sponsored legislation that advanced WFI's overall public policy objectives. Legislation sponsored by Comstock called for union votes by secret ballot, prevented employers from giving employees' information to unions, and prohibited awarding contracts for state-funded construction projects exclusively to unionized firms. Comstock's campaign responded to the report by saying "Barbara Comstock disclosed her federal clients under Virginia law as required."

Comstock was re-elected to her seat in the Virginia House of Delegates in 2011 and 2013. When she won a seat in the U.S. Congress in 2014, she formally resigned her seat in the Virginia House of Delegates and a special election was called to replace her. She was succeeded by Democrat Kathleen Murphy, who had been her opponent in 2013.

== U.S. House of Representatives ==
=== Elections ===
==== 2014 ====
On January 7, 2014, Comstock announced her candidacy for the U.S. House of Representatives from Virginia's 10th District, following the announcement that incumbent Frank Wolf would retire at the end of the 113th Congress.

On April 26, 2014, Comstock won the Republican nomination for the U.S. House of Representatives in the 10th District primary, defeating five other candidates and winning approximately 54% of the total vote.

Comstock and Republican U.S. Senate candidate Ed Gillespie planned on attending a public meeting of the Northern Shenandoah Valley Tea Party in early August 2014. After rumors arose that the gathering could be infiltrated by Democrats, both candidates initially moved the meeting to a private location before opting to speak with the group by phone instead. This decision prompted a statement from David Sparkman, chairman of the Tea Party group, who said "I'm disappointed, I wanted to look these politicians in the eye and take their measure."

Comstock received the endorsements of the United States Chamber of Commerce, the National Federation of Independent Business, and both the Virginia Association of Realtors and the National Association of Realtors. On August 28, 2014, Comstock received the endorsement of the Virginia Police Benevolent Association (VAPBA). In 2012, the VAPBA had endorsed the Democratic challenger to Representative Frank Wolf in the same district.

Shortly before the 2014 election, Comstock's Democratic opponent, Fairfax County Supervisor John Foust, said that she had never had a "real job". "Although he claims he was referring to her jobs in partisan politics", stated the Weekly Standard, "Comstock's campaign attacked this as a sexist remark." Comstock herself called the remark "offensive and demeaning."

Comstock won the election on November 4, 2014, defeating Democrat John Foust with 56 percent of the vote.

==== 2016 ====
Comstock faced Democrat LuAnn Bennett, a real estate executive and ex-wife of former Virginia Congressman Jim Moran, in the 2016 election. Given the swing state status of Virginia in the 2016 presidential election, the race was expected to be one of the most heavily contested races in the country. Democratic strategist Ellen Qualls said the 10th District is "essentially the swingiest district in the swingiest state."

In early October, following the release of the Donald Trump Access Hollywood tape, Comstock called for Donald Trump to drop out of the presidential race. She released a statement that in part said "This is disgusting, vile, and disqualifying. No woman should ever be subjected to this type of obscene behavior and it is unbecoming of anybody seeking high office. In light of these comments, Donald Trump should step aside and allow our party to replace him with Mike Pence or another appropriate nominee from the Republican Party. I cannot in good conscience vote for Donald Trump."

Comstock won re-election by a margin of 53–47%. In February 2015, some constituents called for Comstock to host an in-person town hall meeting rather than a "tele-town hall" conducted via phone.

==== 2018 ====
In early 2017, the Democratic Congressional Campaign Committee named Comstock and her 10th district seat one of their top targets in the 2018 midterm elections. Hillary Clinton had easily won the 10th in 2016 with 52% of the vote to Donald Trump's 42%.

By May 2017, five Democrats had announced their candidacy for the Democratic nomination to run against Comstock. In July 2017, Republican Shak Hill, who ran for the Republican nomination for U.S. Senate in 2014, announced that he was preparing to mount a primary challenge against Comstock in 2018. Comstock won the June 12th primary easily. "Republicans in purple districts are leaving Congress in droves", reported The Washington Post in April 2018. "So why does Barbara Comstock want to stay?" Her answer was: "I'm healthy, my family's healthy, my kids are healthy, I love this job."

Comstock had been named as a potential candidate for the U.S. Senate against incumbent Tim Kaine in the 2018 election but decided not to run against him.

In the general election, she ran for re-election against Democratic State Senator Jennifer Wexton in what was considered one of the most competitive House races, given that Clinton and Governor Ralph Northam easily won her district in 2016 and 2017, respectively. After Democrats made significant gains in Northern Virginia in the 2017 elections, Comstock was the only elected Republican above the county level in much of the district. She was the last Republican to represent a significant part of the Washington metropolitan area in Congress. In the November 2018 general election, Comstock was defeated by Wexton, who took 56% of the vote to Comstock's 44%.

=== Committee assignments ===
- Committee on House Administration
- Committee on Science, Space and Technology
  - Subcommittee on Energy
  - Subcommittee on Research and Technology (Chair)
- Committee on Transportation and Infrastructure
  - Subcommittee on Aviation
  - Subcommittee on Economic Development, Public Buildings and Emergency Management
  - Subcommittee on Highways and Transit

=== Caucus memberships ===
- Congressional Arts Caucus
- Climate Solutions Caucus

== Political positions ==
In the 115th United States Congress, she had voted with the Republican Party 94.7% of the time. Comstock was ranked as the 82nd most bipartisan member of the U.S. House of Representatives during the 114th United States Congress in the Bipartisan Index created by The Lugar Center.

She was a member of the Republican Main Street Partnership.

=== Vote Smart Political Courage Test ===
Vote Smart, a non-profit, non-partisan research organization that collects and distributes information on candidates for public office in the United States, "researched presidential and congressional candidates' public records to determine candidates' likely responses on certain key issues." According to Vote Smart's 2016 analysis, Comstock generally supported pro-life legislation, opposes an income tax increase, supported federal spending as a means of promoting economic growth, supported lowering taxes as a means of promoting economic growth, supported the building of the Keystone Pipeline, supported government funding for the development of renewable energy, opposes the federal regulation of greenhouse gas emissions, opposed gun-control legislation, supported repealing the Affordable Care Act, supported requiring immigrants who are unlawfully present to be deported, opposed same-sex marriage, and supported increased American intervention in Iraq and Syria beyond air support.

=== Abortion ===
At Middlebury College (Class of 1981) Comstock was known as being vigorously opposed to abortion and was often one of the few students in her political science classes to stake out that position. As a member of the Virginia General Assembly, Comstock supported a ban on abortion except in cases of rape, incest, or when the mother's life is in danger. In 2011, Comstock voted in favor of Virginia HB 462, which required women to have transvaginal ultrasounds before receiving an abortion. When opponents pointed out that this would necessitate an internal ultrasound for early-term pregnancies, an amendment was passed to limit the requirement to external ultrasounds only. She also voted in favor of the amendment. She supported making birth control available to women over the counter.

=== Environment ===
In March 2017, Comstock signed onto a Republican resolution acknowledging the impact of human activities on global climate.

=== Health care ===
She was one of twenty Republicans in the House to vote against the American Health Care Act of 2017 (H.R. 1628), the House Republican bill to repeal and replace the ACA.

=== Internet ===
Comstock opposed net neutrality. In 2015, in the wake of a Federal Communications Commission (FCC) ruling protecting net neutrality, Comstock said that net neutrality is "government overreach" and "robs the internet of its freedom".

In March 2017, she voted to reverse a landmark FCC ruling, opening the door for internet service providers to sell customer data. During the preceding election cycle, she accepted $56,457 in donations from corporations in the telecom industry and employees of those corporations.

=== Immigration ===
In a 2014 election debate, Comstock criticized President Barack Obama's executive orders on immigration (see Deferred Action for Childhood Arrivals, Deferred Action for Parents of Americans), calling for immigration-law policy changes to be made via legislation. Comstock also suggested tracking people entering the U.S. like "FedEx can track packages coming in here all of the time".

Comstock criticized President Donald Trump's 2017 executive order to impose a temporary ban on entry to the U.S. to citizens of seven Muslim-majority countries, saying: "The president's Executive Order [goes] beyond the increased vetting actions that Congress has supported on a bipartisan basis and inexplicably applied to Green Card holders. This should be addressed and corrected expeditiously." Comstock supported Trump's proposed border wall on the Southern border.

In February 2018, Comstock "generated national headlines when she rebuked the president during a meeting ...at the White House on the dangers of the deadly gang MS-13." Trump said that "if congressional Democrats would not support a legislative crackdown on dangerous illegal immigrants, he would advocate shutting down the federal government." Comstock replied, "We don't need a government shutdown. ... I think both sides have learned that a government shutdown was bad, it wasn't good for them." While Comstock described the exchange as "a polite conversation", The Washington Post said that "[e]veryone else called it an extraordinary public scolding of a sitting U.S. president."

In 2018, the U.S. Senate passed a bill introduced by Comstock which gave the federal government greater latitude in deporting immigrants who were suspected of gang activity.

=== LGBT rights ===
Comstock opposed same-sex marriage. In 2012, she voted for legislation that allowed private adoption and foster care agencies to deny adoptions to gay individuals. She supported the nomination of Tracy Thorne-Begland to the Richmond Circuit Court in 2013, Virginia's first openly gay judge. She has voted in favor of legislation to strengthen schools' anti-bullying policies.

=== Science ===
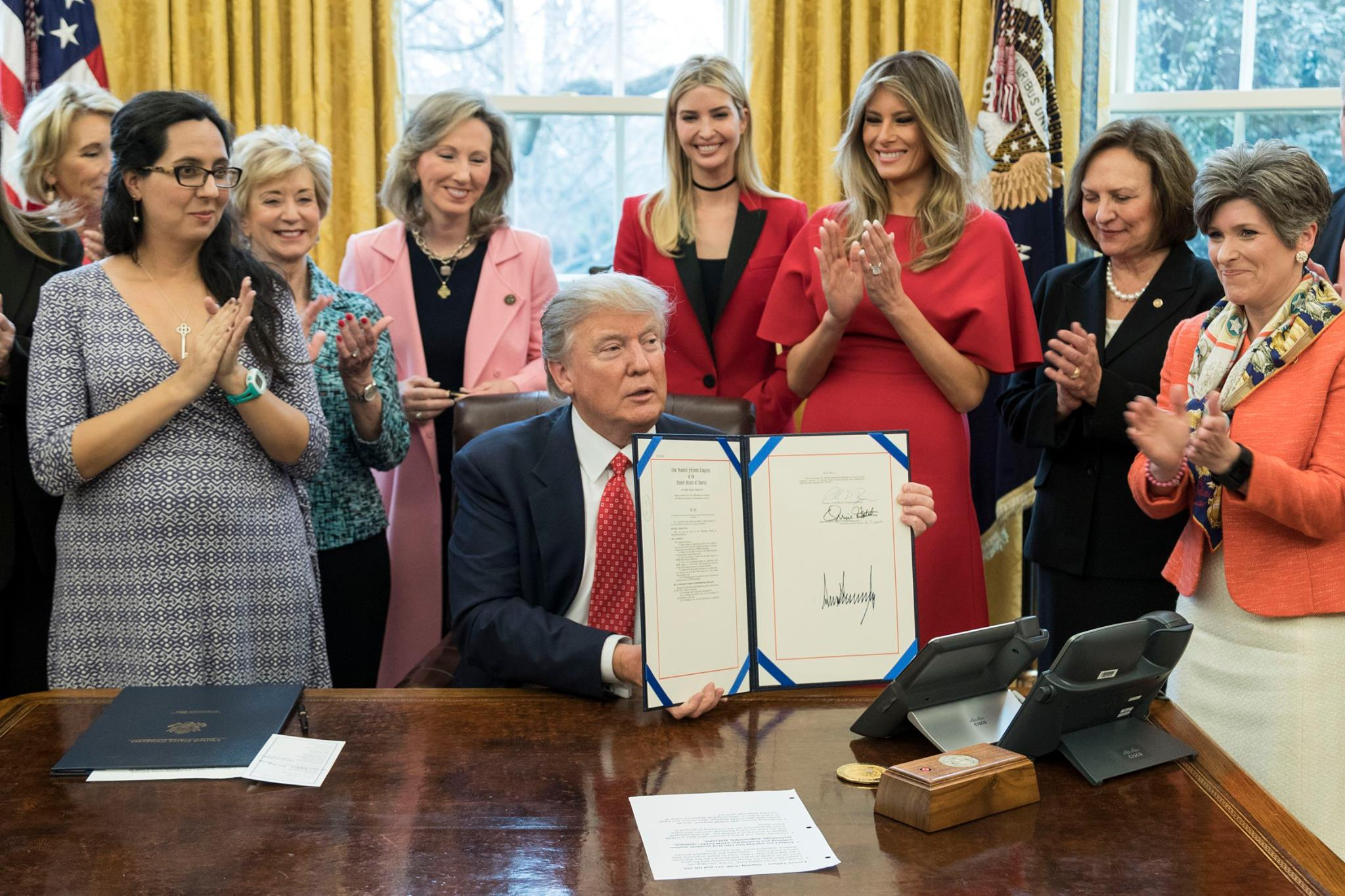
President Donald Trump holds up a newly signed INSPIRE Women Act on Tuesday, February 28, 2017, which requires NASA to create incentives for women and girls to pursue careers in STEM fields.

In February 2017, President Donald Trump signed into law the INSPIRE Women Act, a bill sponsored by Comstock, which compels the director of the National Aeronautics and Space Administration (NASA) to encourage women and girls to pursue an education in the science, technology, engineering, and mathematics (STEM) fields.

She supported adult stem cell research.

=== Transportation ===
In April 2016, Comstock said she would support legislation introduced by Democrat John Delaney to overhaul the board that oversees the Washington Metropolitan Area Transit Authority, which runs Washington's Metrorail system. The legislation would have required the next three federal appointments to the authority's board of directors to be either a certified transit, management, or financial expert.

=== Women ===
In 2017, Comstock joined first lady Melania Trump and first daughter Ivanka Trump in the Oval Office as the president signed Comstock's bill, the INSPIRE Women Act, which encouraged women and girls to study math and science as well as pursue aerospace careers."

In November 2017, Comstock opposed the Senate candidacy of Roy Moore in Alabama because of sexual abuse allegations. "To date Roy Moore has not provided any credible explanation or response to the detailed allegations", Comstock said.

In November 2017, Comstock told a House hearing on sexual harassment on Capitol Hill "that she was told about a staffer who quit her job after a lawmaker asked her to bring work material to his house, then exposed himself."

A December 2017 article in the Weekly Standard stated that Comstock had "taken a leading role in pushing for congressional reforms aimed at combatting sexual harassment." She had "co-sponsored a resolution that, among other small changes, requires all lawmakers and their staff to complete anti-harassment and anti-discrimination training at the start of each session", but she saw that proposal "as a quick fix, and was looking to make broader, more authoritative changes to the law."

In February 2018, Comstock told a House subcommittee that women were being pushed out of jobs in science and technology. In May 2018, Comstock joined with Congresswoman Lois Frankel (D-FL) in calling on airlines to address sexual harassment on flights. "Approximately 80 percent of flight attendants are female and they are often objectified on a daily basis by passengers, coworkers, and superiors", the congresswomen wrote. "It is perhaps not surprising that sexual harassment is prevalent given the industry's past objectification of flight attendants."

=== Gun policy ===
Comstock had an "A" rating from the NRA Political Victory Fund (NRA-PVF). In the 2014 and 2016 election cycles, she received $14,850 in campaign contributions from the NRA. In 2017, she was one of 213 co-sponsors of legislation seeking to "amend the federal criminal code to allow a qualified individual to carry a concealed handgun into or possess a concealed handgun in another state that allows individuals to carry concealed firearms." She voted for H.J.Res 40, signed into law in February 2017, which nullifies a rule that "implements a plan to provide to the National Instant Criminal History Background Check System the name of an individual who meets certain criteria, including that benefit payments are made through a representative payee because the individual is determined to be mentally incapable of managing them. (Current law prohibits firearm sale or transfer to and purchase or possession by a person who has been adjudicated as a mental defective.)"

In April 2018, NBC News reported that "in the wake of the Parkland shooting and the national movement that has followed, gun control supporters hope they can change that dynamic in the 2018 midterm elections, starting with Comstock's district in northern Virginia." Several of her Democratic opponents were "making gun control centerpieces of their campaigns." Mark Rozell of George Mason University said that "demographic changes and current events" added up to "almost a perfect storm against her."

=== Fairness doctrine ===
In October 2008, Comstock and Democratic operative Lanny Davis co-wrote an article in the National Review in which they expressed strong opposition to the call for reinstatement of the FCC fairness doctrine. "Historically," they wrote, "opposition to the Fairness Doctrine has been genuinely a bipartisan issue." They noted that opponents of the fairness doctrine included left-wingers like Dan Rather and Alan Colmes and right-wingers like Rush Limbaugh and Sean Hannity; they recalled that in 1978 "NBC aired a show on the Holocaust and was sued by a group demanding air time to argue that the Holocaust was a myth. The network had to defend itself for over three years." They concluded that "we need more speech, not less, and not government regulated speech."

== Post-political career ==
Comstock now regularly appears on MSNBC, Fox News, CNN, and other media outlets as a policy and political commentator.

In the spring of 2021, Comstock was a fellow at the USC Center for the Political Future.

In June 2021, she encouraged her fellow Republicans to move on from Donald Trump, whom she called the "patron saint of sore losers". In a February 2022 interview following strong remarks by Mike Pence disputing Trump's claims that Pence could have overturned the election outcome, Comstock said that "the Trump operation is in sort of a meltdown", and that "the walls are closing in on Trump" with respect to the ongoing House investigation of the January 6, 2021, breach of the U.S. Capitol. In August 2024, Comstock signaled her intention to vote for Kamala Harris in the 2024 United States presidential election. In October 2024, Comstock predicted that there is "...a silent group of women who will crawl over broken glass to vote against Trump." That same month, she endorsed Eugene Vindman and Suhas Subramanyam, both Democrats, in Virginia's 7th and 10th congressional districts, respectively. In 2025, she endorsed Democratic gubernatorial candidate Abigail Spanberger against the Republican candidate, Winsome Earle-Sears.

In 2023, she organized a new lobbying group, American Consumer & Investor Institute, which represents consumer voices on issues related to the regulation of financial technology firms and cryptocurrency. In February 2025, former U.S. Rep. Blaine Luetkemeyer took over as chief executive of the group.

== Personal life ==
She has been married to Elwyn Charles Comstock, whom she had met in high school, since October 9, 1982. They have three children together.

Among Comstock's close friends is Democratic strategist Donna Brazile. According to The Washington Post, Comstock helped her when she "couldn't find family and friends caught up in Hurricanes Katrina and Rita". Comstock said of Brazile, "We don't agree on many issues, but we consider each other to be worthy of respect." She is also close to retired Supreme Court Justice Anthony M. Kennedy who, when her father was rushed to the hospital, went to her parents' house to "monitor ... the pumpkin bread baking in their kitchen." Comstock was friends with legal analyst Barbara Olson, who was killed in the September 11 attacks. Another good friend is David N. Bossie, president of Citizens United and Donald Trump's deputy campaign manager. "[Trump] is the hardest-working man I've ever been around", Bossie said. "Barbara Comstock is the hardest-working woman I've ever been around."

== Electoral history ==
Virginia House of Delegates General Election, 2009
| Party | Candidate | Votes | % |
|---|---|---|---|
| Republican | Barbara Comstock | 12,636 | 50.85% |
| Democratic | Margaret Vanderhye | 12,214 | 49.15% |
| Write-in | | 26 | 0.10% |
| Total votes | | 24,850 | 100% |

Virginia House of Delegates General Election, 2011
| Party | Candidate | Votes | % |
|---|---|---|---|
| Republican | Barbara Comstock | 11,628 | 54.81% |
| Democratic | Pamela Danner | 9,573 | 45.12% |
| Write-in | | 16 | 0.08% |
| Total votes | | 21,217 | 100% |

Virginia House of Delegates General Election, 2013
| Party | Candidate | Votes | % |
|---|---|---|---|
| Republican | Barbara Comstock | 14,962 | 50.64% |
| Democratic | Kathleen Murphy | 14,540 | 49.21% |
| Write-in | | 42 | 0.14% |
| Total votes | | 29,544 | 100% |

U.S. House of Representatives General Election, 2014
| Party | Candidate | Votes | % |
|---|---|---|---|
| Republican | Barbara Comstock | 125,867 | 56.49% |
| Democratic | John Foust | 89,895 | 40.35% |

U.S. House of Representatives General Election, 2016
| Party | Candidate | Votes | % |
|---|---|---|---|
| Republican | Barbara Comstock | 210,791 | 52.69% |
| Democratic | LuAnn Bennett | 187,712 | 46.92% |
| Write-in | | 1,580 | 0.39% |
| Total votes | | 400,083 | 100% |

U.S. House of Representatives General Election, 2018
| Party | Candidate | Votes | % |
|---|---|---|---|
| Democratic | Jennifer Wexton | 206,089 | 56.20% |
| Republican | Barbara Comstock (Incumbent) | 160,529 | 43.80% |

== See also ==
- Women in the United States House of Representatives

U.S. House of Representatives
| Preceded by Frank Wolf | Member of the U.S. House of Representatives from Virginia's 10th congressional district 2015–2019 | Succeeded by Jennifer Wexton |
U.S. order of precedence (ceremonial)
| Preceded by Dave Brat as Former U.S. Representative | Order of precedence of the United States as Former U.S. Representative | Succeeded by Elaine Luria as Former U.S. Representative |
