= Dranesville Tavern =

Historic commercial building in Virginia, United States

- U.S. National Register of Historic Places
- Virginia Landmarks Register
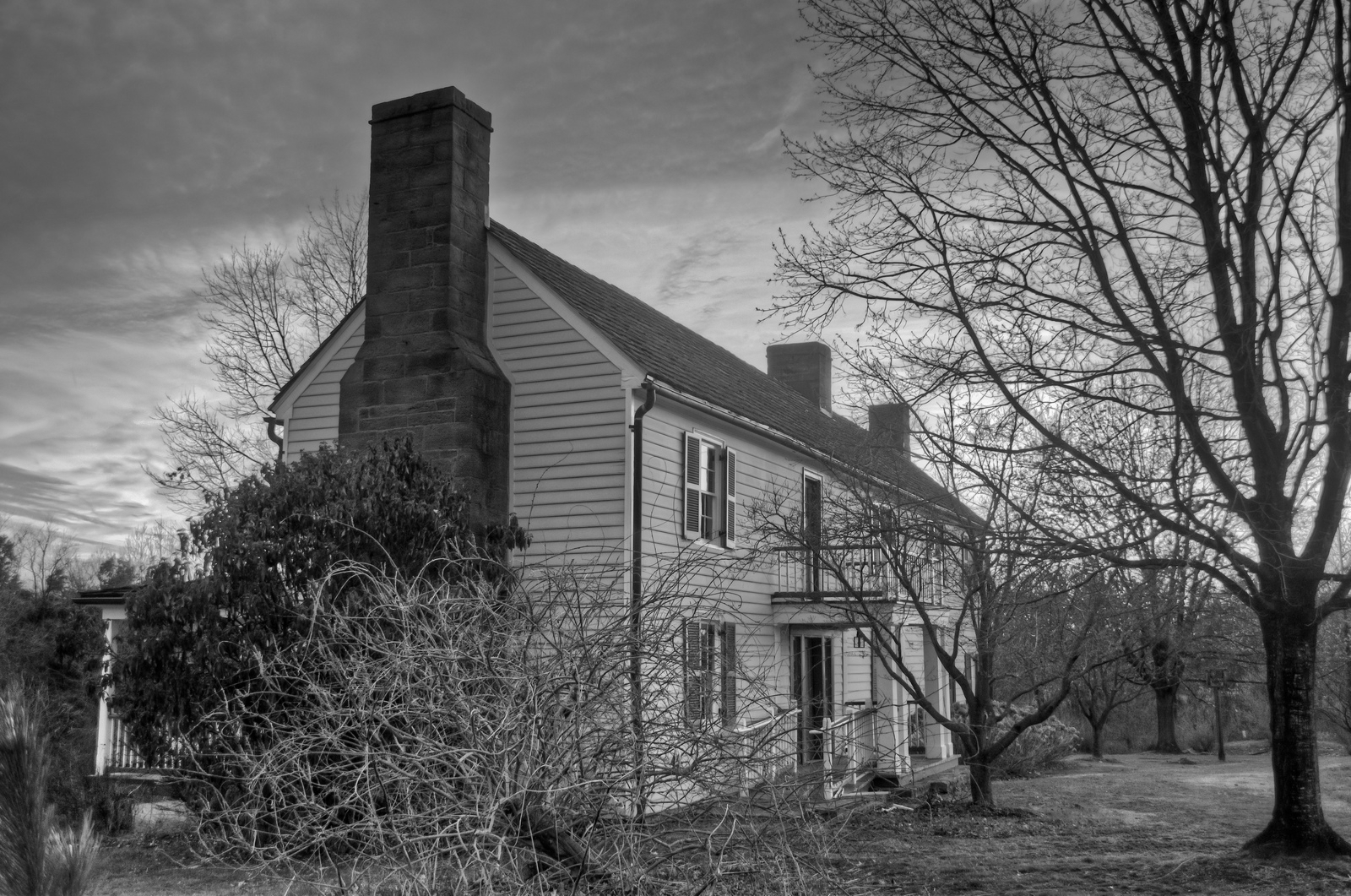

- Location within Northern Virginia Location within Virginia Location within the United States
- Location: 11919 Leesburg Pike, in or near Herndon, Virginia
- Coordinates: 39°0′28″N 77°21′38″W
- Area: 5 acres (2.0 ha)
- Built: 1850
- Built by: Cockerille, Sanford
- Architectural style: Greek Revival, Vernacular Greek Revival
- NRHP reference No.: 72001393
- VLR No.: 029-0011

Significant dates
- Added to NRHP: November 9, 1972
- Designated VLR: April 18, 1972

The Dranesville Tavern that was located in Dranesville, Virginia dates from 1823. It was listed on the National Register of Historic Places in 1972. The building has been moved from its original location and is now located near Herndon.

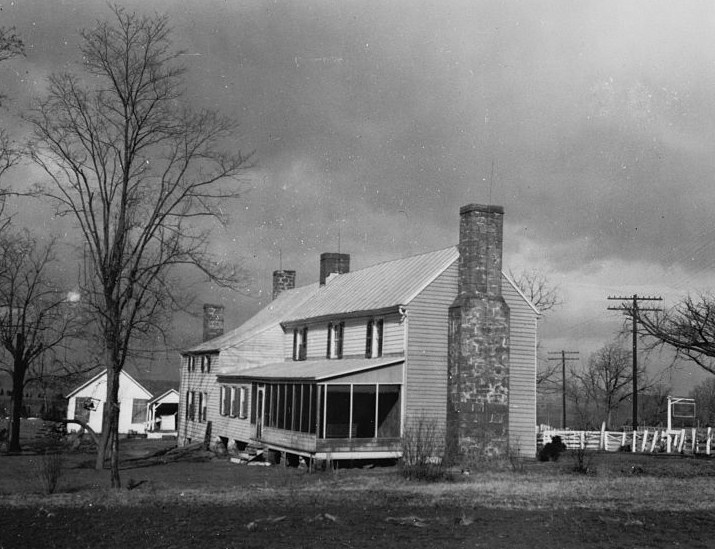
HABS photo

The tavern was built in 1823 by Stanford Cockerille at the intersection of Georgetown Pike and Alexandria Leesburg Pike. It was a "wagon stand" type of tavern, catering to teamsters. It remained open to the public until 1946, and to boarders until 1968.

The proposed widening of Route 7 in the mid-1960s threatened the Dranesville Tavern. In 1968, the building was moved 130 feet from its original location to preserve it. In July 2025, the Fairfax County Park Authority announced a "Resident Curator Program" which allows residents to live in the tavern for free in exchange for the rehabilitation and long-term maintenance of the property.
