= Women Who Work (book) =

2017 self-help book by Ivanka Trump

- Author: Ivanka Trump
- Language: English
- Genre: Self-help
- Publisher: Portfolio
- Publication date: May 2, 2017
- Publication place: United States
- Pages: 243
- ISBN: 978-0-7352-1132-2

Women Who Work is a 2017 book by Ivanka Trump. A self-help book intended to help women achieve self-actualization, it deals with work–life balance among other topics. It includes guest essays, and several businesspeople, political figures, and self-help authors are quoted.

== Reception ==
The book received mixed reviews from critics. Jennifer Senior, writing for The New York Times, said that while the book's intended audience is initially presumed to be a wide range of women, class bias emerges later in the book. For example, Trump classifies grocery shopping as a task that is neither urgent nor important, and cites not being able to treat herself to a massage as an indicator of how busy she was during her father's 2016 presidential campaign, thus revealing herself to be out of touch with working-class women. In the Associated Press, however, Catherine Lucey said that the book shows Trump has become a more serious writer since her previous self-help book, the 2009 The Trump Card. Less charitably, NPR book reviewer Annalisa Quinn described the writing as "a sea of blandities", and that "reading it feels like eating scented cotton balls".
