= Ivanka Trump =

American businesswoman (born 1981)

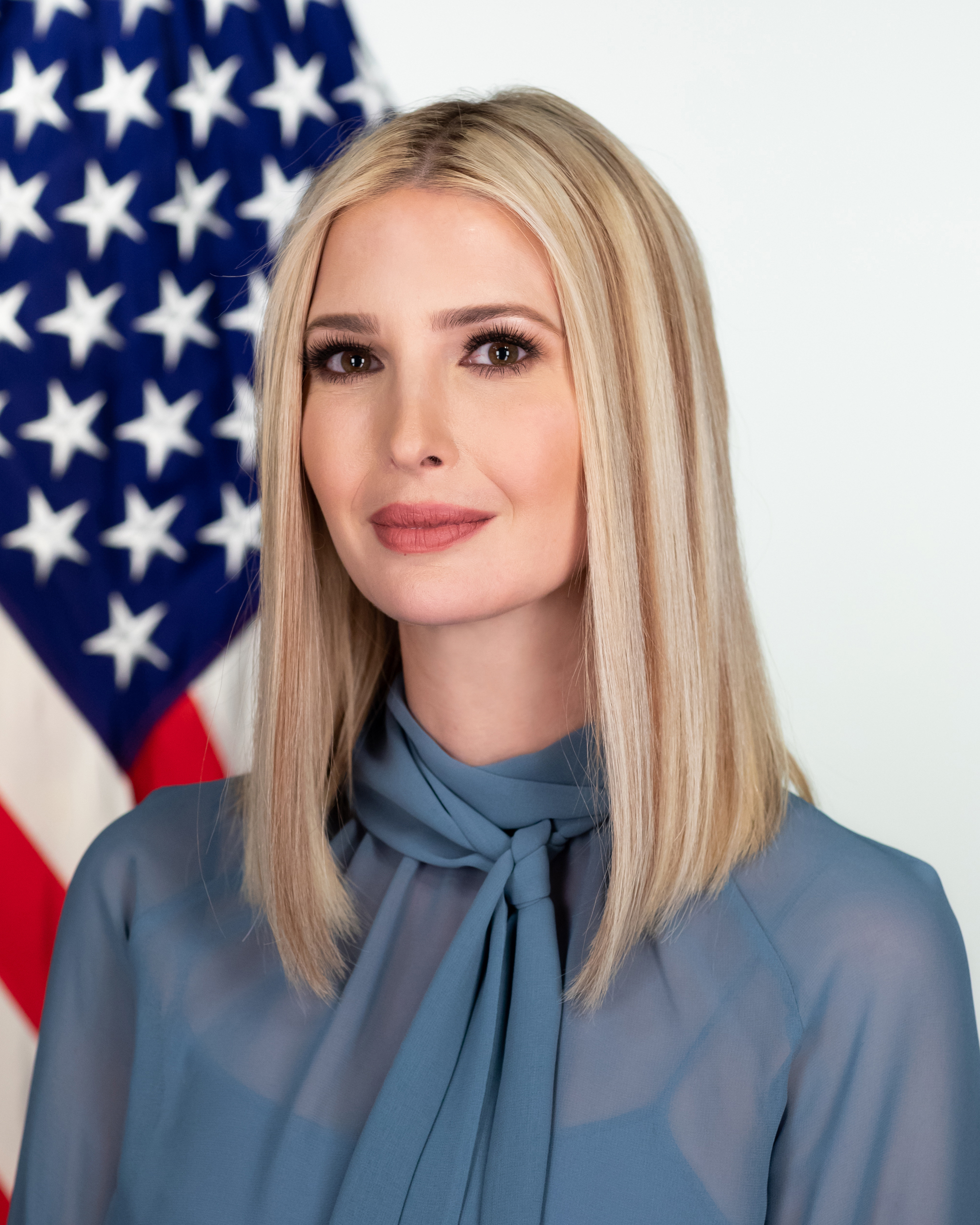
- Official portrait, 2020

Director of the Office of Economic Initiatives and Entrepreneurship
- In office c. April 2017 – January 20, 2021
- President: Donald Trump

Advisor to the President
- In office March 29, 2017 – January 20, 2021
- President: Donald Trump

Personal details
- Born: Ivana Marie Trump; October 30, 1981 (age 45) New York City, U.S.
- Party: Republican (2018–present)
- Other political affiliations: Democratic (1999–2018)
- Spouse: Jared Kushner (m. 2009)
- Children: 3
- Parents: Donald Trump; Ivana Zelníčková
- Relatives: Trump family Kushner family (by marriage)
- Education: University of Pennsylvania (BS)
- Ivanka Trump's voice Ivanka Trump speaks on the G20 Osaka Summit. Recorded June 28, 2019

Ivana Marie "Ivanka" Trump (/ɪˈvɑːŋkə/ iv-AHNG-kə; born October 30, 1981) is an American businesswoman. She is the second child of Donald Trump, the 45th and 47th president of the United States, and his first wife, Ivana Trump. Ivanka was a presidential advisor during her father's first administration (2017–2021).

Born and raised in Manhattan, Trump attended the Chapin School and later Choate Rosemary Hall. She pursued higher education at Georgetown University before transferring to the University of Pennsylvania, where she graduated cum laude with a bachelor's degree in economics in 2004.

Trump converted to Judaism prior to marrying Jared Kushner, a real estate developer, in 2009. The couple has three children. Prior to her political career, she was an executive vice president of her family-owned Trump Organization and also a boardroom judge on her father's television show, The Apprentice. She also had a fashion lifestyle brand under her own name that consisted of apparel, footwear, handbags, jewelry, and fragrance. Trump shut down the company in July 2018.

In January 2017, Trump became an unofficial advisor in her father's first presidential administration alongside her husband. In March that year, she became an official employee in his administration. While serving in the White House, she continued to retain ownership of businesses. This raised ethics concerns, specifically conflicts of interest.

== Early life and education ==
Ivana Marie Trump was born on October 30, 1981, in Manhattan, New York City, as the second child of Donald Trump and his first wife, the Czech-American model Ivana (née Zelníčková). For most of her life, she has been nicknamed "Ivanka", a Slavic diminutive form of her first name Ivana. Trump's parents divorced in 1990 when she was nine years old. She has two full brothers, Donald Jr. and Eric, a half-sister, Tiffany, and a half-brother, Barron.

Trump attended Christ Church and the Chapin School in Manhattan until switching to Choate Rosemary Hall at age 15 in Wallingford, Connecticut. While attending boarding school as a teenager, she also began modeling "on weekends and holidays and absolutely not during the school year", according to her mother. In May 1997, she was featured on the cover of Seventeen as well as in campaigns for Tommy Hilfiger, Thierry Mugler, and Versace.

After graduating from Choate in 2000, Trump attended Georgetown University for two years before transferring to the University of Pennsylvania, from which she graduated cum laude with a bachelor's degree in economics in 2004.

== Career ==
=== Business ===
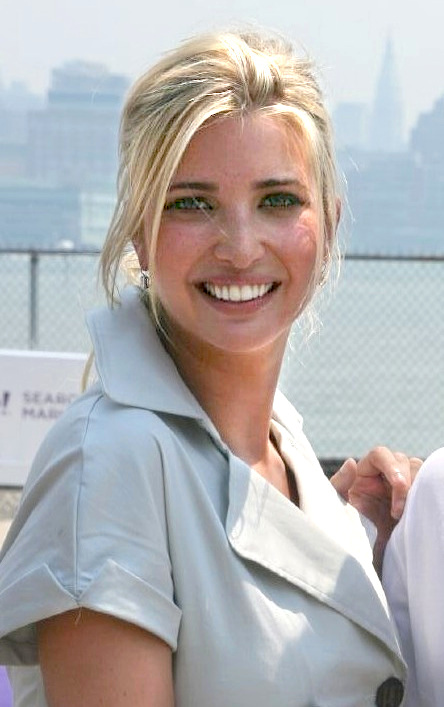
Trump in July 2007

After graduating from Wharton, Trump briefly worked for the real estate firm Forest City Ratner. As executive vice president of development and acquisitions of the Trump Organization, she was responsible for the domestic and global expansion of the company's real estate interests. Trump led the request for proposal (RFP) with the General Services Administration in February 2012, resulting in the final selection of the Trump Organization to develop the historic Old Post Office in Washington, D.C. She then oversaw the $200-million conversion of the building into a luxury hotel, which opened in 2016. Trump also led the acquisition and redevelopment of the Doral Hotel, a 700-room resort, in Miami.

Independent of her family's real estate business, Trump also had her own line of Ivanka Trump fashion items, which included clothes, handbags, shoes, and accessories, available in U.S. and Canadian department stores including Macy's and Hudson's Bay.

Trump formed a partnership with Dynamic Diamond Corp. in 2007 to create Ivanka Trump Fine Jewelry, a line of diamond and gold jewelry sold at her first flagship retail store in Manhattan. She later began selling jewelry online through her brand’s website, which was relaunched in August 2010. Her flagship moved from Madison Avenue to 109 Mercer Street, a larger space in the SoHo district, in November 2011. Celebrities were spotted wearing her jewelry including Jennifer Lopez on the cover of Glamour and Rihanna on the cover of W magazine. Her brand was named "Launch of the Year" in 2010 by Footwear News. Trump's industry recognitions include the Breakthrough Award at the Accessories Council Excellence Awards presented by designer Carolina Herrera in 2015. Her collection was covered in magazines such as Harper's Bazaar, Forbes Life, Golf Magazine, Town & Country, and Vogue. Trump has been featured prominently in profiles in publications including the New York Times, Wall Street Journal, the Washington Post, Vogue, Elle, Harper's Bazaar, Forbes, Fortune, Marie Claire, and Glamour. Members of 100 Women in Hedge Funds selected Trump to serve on their board in December 2012.

Between 2010 and 2018, Trump worked as a paid consultant for The Trump Organization while maintaining a separate status from formal employment. She stepped away from these roles upon becoming a senior advisor in the White House. In 2012, she was named to the board of 100 Women in Hedge Funds. Her fashion brand, which included apparel and accessories, was sold in various retailers and earned her a Breakthrough Award from the Accessories Council in 2015. The brand was later involved in a legal dispute that was settled out of court.

Between 2016 and 2017, Trump applied for numerous trademarks in China, with several approved around the time of President Xi Jinping’s 2017 visit to the U.S. A Chinese official stated the applications were processed according to standard procedures, and a trademark lawyer noted the timeline was not unusual. That same year, she partnered with the World Bank to support a fund for female entrepreneurs.

In 2018, Trump closed her fashion brand to focus on public policy, following declining sales and increased scrutiny of overseas manufacturing practices.

After leaving government service, Trump and Kushner partnered with the latter's firm Affinity Partners on a $1.4 billion redevelopment of Sazan Island in Albania, which locals often refer to as "Trump Island." In 2023, she co-founded Planet Harvest, a company focused on tackling food waste by redirecting surplus produce and creating consumer goods from excess crops.

=== Television ===
Trump filled in for the businesswoman Carolyn Kepcher on five episodes of the fifth season of her father's television program The Apprentice, first appearing to help judge the Gillette task in week 2. Like Kepcher, Trump visited the site of the tasks and spoke to the teams. Trump collaborated with season 5 winner Sean Yazbeck on his winner's project of choice, Trump SoHo Hotel-Condominium. She replaced Kepcher as a primary boardroom judge during the sixth season of The Apprentice and its follow-up iteration, Celebrity Apprentice.

In 1997, at the age of 15, Trump co-hosted the Miss Teen USA Pageant, which was partially owned by her father, Donald Trump, from 1996 to 2005. In 2006, she was a guest judge on Project Runway's third season. She appeared as a guest judge on season 4 of Project Runway All Stars in 2014 and 2015. In 2010, Trump and her husband made a cameo portraying themselves in Season 4, Episode 6 of Gossip Girl.

=== Modeling ===
While Trump was attending boarding school as a teenager, she also began modeling "on weekends and holidays and absolutely not during the school year", according to her mother Ivana Trump. She was featured in advertisements for Tommy Hilfiger, Elle, Vogue, Teen Vogue, Harper's Bazaar, Versace, and Thierry Mugler. She also engaged in fashion runway work. In May 1997, she was featured on the cover of Seventeen. Trump has been profiled in many women's fashion magazines, including Vogue, Glamour, Marie Claire, and Elle. She was featured on covers such as Harper's Bazaar, Forbes, Forbes Life, Marie Claire, Golf Digest, Town & Country, Elle Décor, Shape, and Stuff magazine. Trump was featured in Vanity Fair's annual International Best Dressed Hall of Fame List in 2007 and 2008.

=== Books ===
==== The Trump Card: Playing to Win in Work and Life ====
In October 2009, Trump's first self-help book, The Trump Card: Playing to Win in Work and Life, was published; according to the ghostwriter Daniel Paisner, he co-wrote the book.

==== Women Who Work: Rewriting the Rules for Success ====
In May 2017, her second self-help book, Women Who Work: Rewriting the Rules for Success, was published; it is a self-improvement book for women in business, which featured contributions from business and leadership experts such as Adam Grant, Elizabeth Cronise McLaughlin, Simon Sinek, and Stephen Covey. She donated $200,000 in royalties to the National Urban League and the Boys and Girls Clubs of America. Half the advance of the book was also donated to fund a Women's Entrepreneur Center at the National Urban League in Baltimore, Maryland, after visiting the facility with Marc Morial, President of the National Urban League.

The book was part of Trump's associated marketing campaign also titled "Women Who Work". It received mixed reviews from critics.

== Trump campaign and first administration ==
=== 2016 presidential campaign and election ===
Trump introduced her father at the Trump Tower in 2015 as he announced his candidacy for president of the United States. She publicly endorsed his presidential campaign and made public appearances supporting and defending him. However, she admitted mixed feelings about his presidential ambitions, saying in October 2015, "As a citizen, I love what he's doing. As a daughter, it's obviously more complicated."

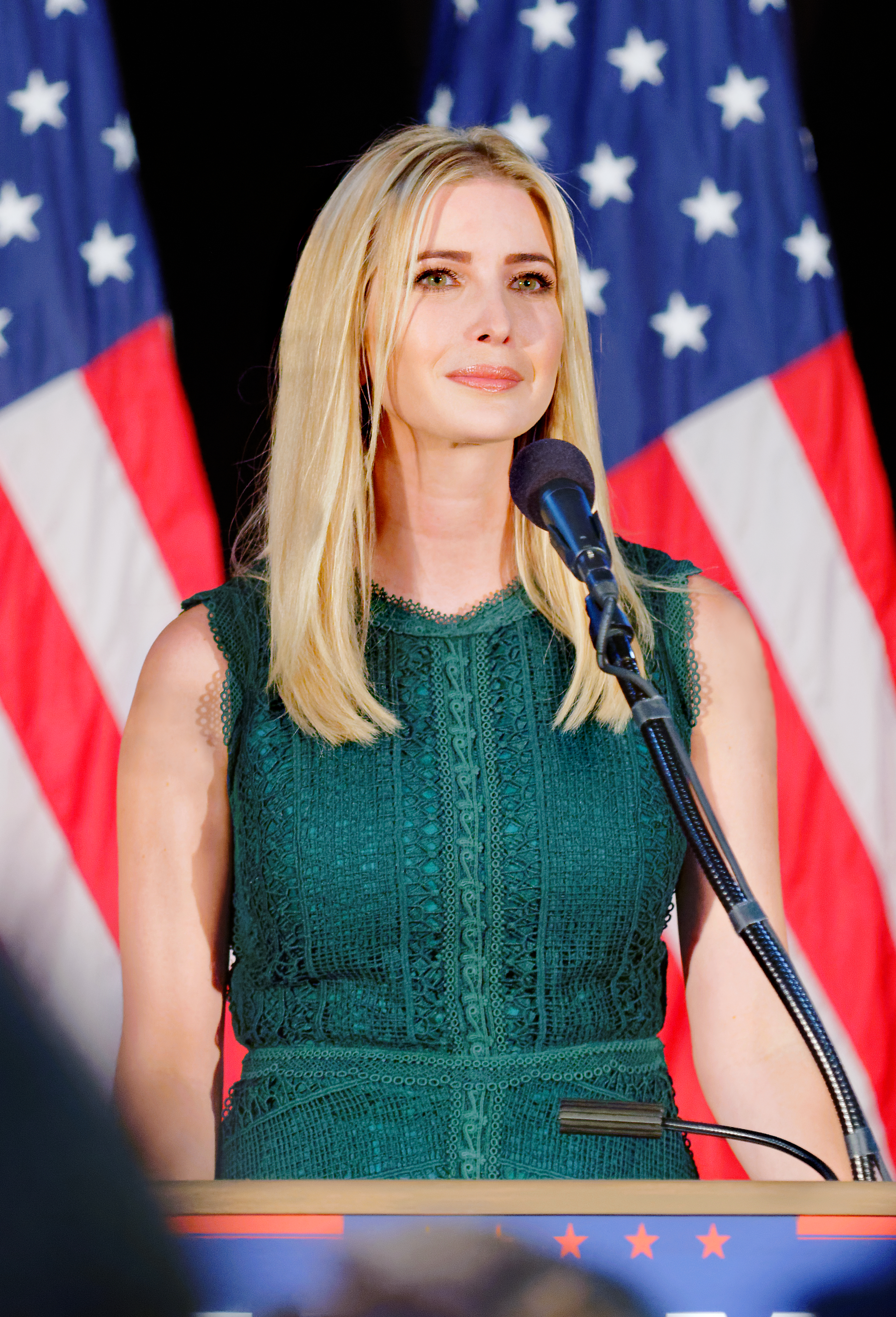
Speaking at her father Donald's presidential campaign in September 2016

In January 2016, Trump praised her father in a radio ad that aired in the early voting states of Iowa and New Hampshire. She appeared by his side following the results of early voting states in 2016, in particular briefly speaking in South Carolina. She was not able to vote in the New York primary in April 2016 because she had missed the October 2015 deadline to change her registration to Republican.

Trump introduced her father in a speech immediately before his own speech at the 2016 Republican National Convention (RNC) in July. Trump addressed issues including equal pay for working mothers and the availability of affordable, high-quality child care. She stated, "One of my father's greatest talents is the ability to see the potential in people", and said he would "Make America Great Again". Her speech was well received as portraying Donald Trump "in a warmer-than-usual light", according to The Washington Post. After the speech, viewers commented that the speech was "one of the best – if not the best – of the night", and that Ivanka is the "greatest asset Donald Trump has". Others said that her speech was the "high point of the convention".

An earlier Post article had questioned whether the policy positions Trump espoused were closer to those of Hillary Clinton than to those of her father.

Trump attended her father’s presidential inauguration and was involved in coordinating some event logistics, including rates for venues and meals at the Trump International Hotel, where the inaugural committee used privately raised funds—a common practice for such events.

=== Advisor to the President of the United States ===
In January 2017, Trump resigned from her position at the Trump Organization. The organization also removed images of Trump and her father from their websites, in accordance with official advice on federal ethics rules.

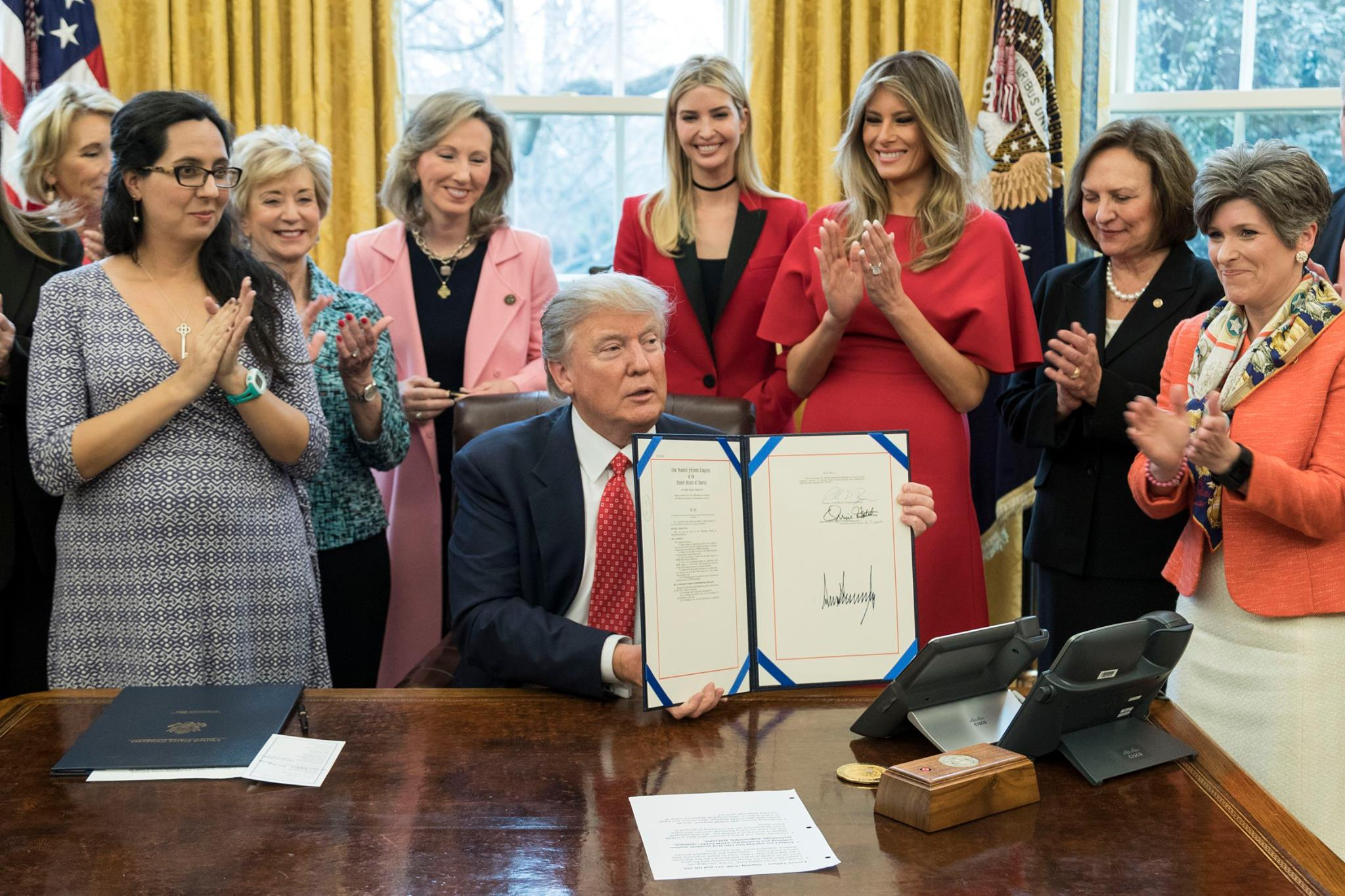
Trump (fourth from right) attending the signing ceremony for the INSPIRE Women Act on February 28, 2017, in the Oval Office of the White House

After advising her father in an unofficial capacity for the first two months of his administration, Trump was appointed "Advisor to the President," a government employee, on March 29, 2017. (Note: The original designation of "First Daughter" was later dropped from the official title. Ivanka Trump is sometimes also called a 'Senior Advisor to the President' (or sometimes a 'senior advisor to the President', without the upper case 'S' and 'A'), even though that is actually the title of her husband Jared Kushner, while her own title is 'Advisor to the President'.) She did not take any salary for the position and didn't receive any government health benefits during her four years at the White House. She also became the head of the newly established Office of Economic Initiatives and Entrepreneurship.

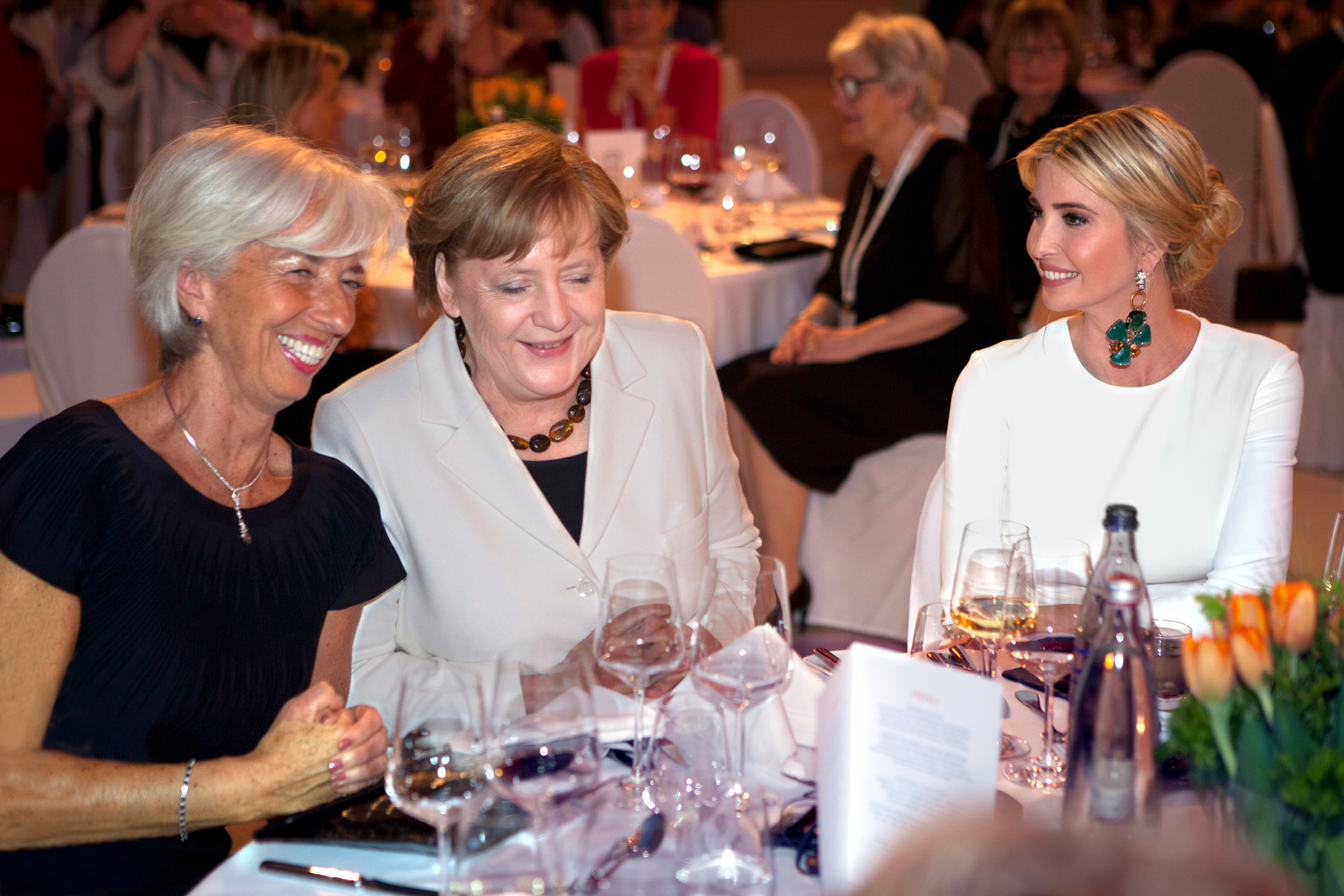
With Christine Lagarde and Angela Merkel at the W20 Conference Gala Dinner in Berlin, April 2017

In late April 2017, Trump hired Julie Radford as her chief of staff. Before the end of the month, Trump and Radford had plans to travel with Dina Powell and Hope Hicks to the first W20 women's summit. The W20 was organized by the National Council of German Women's Organizations and the Association of German Women Entrepreneurs as one of the preparatory meetings leading up to the G20 head-of-state summit in July. At the conference, Trump spoke about women's rights. The same month, Trump and then World Bank president Jim Yong Kim authored an op-ed published in the Financial Times on women's economic empowerment, highlighting the critical role that women play in the development of societies and the business case for involving women in the formal economy.

In July 2017, Trump attended the G20 Summit in Hamburg, Germany, with President Trump and the United States delegation. She launched We-Fi (Women Entrepreneurs Finance Initiative), a United States-led billion-dollar World Bank initiative to advance women's entrepreneurship.

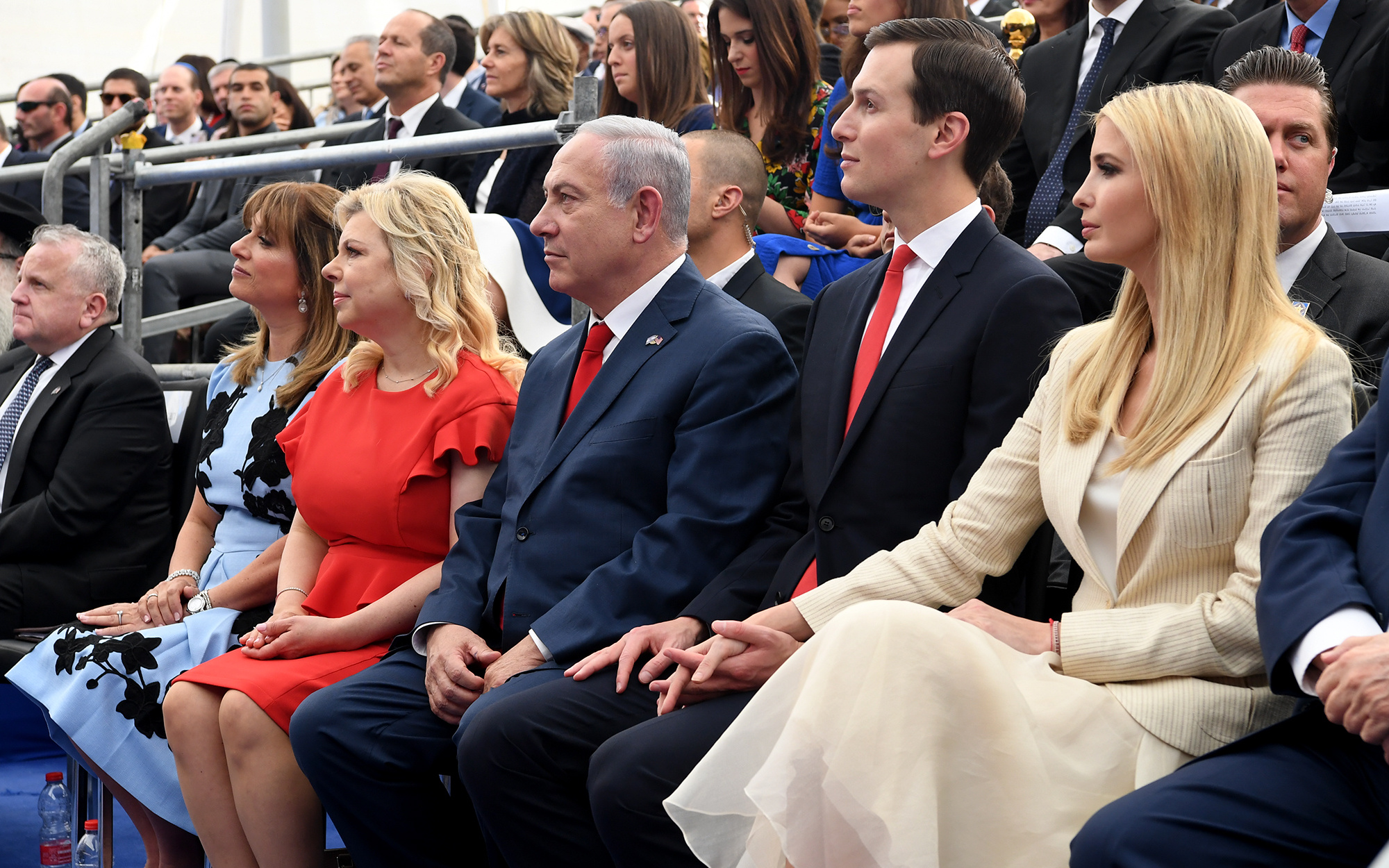
Ivanka, Kushner and Israeli Prime Minister Benjamin Netanyahu attend the opening of the U.S. Embassy to Israel in Jerusalem on May 14, 2018.

In August 2017, President Trump announced that Ivanka would lead a U.S. delegation to India in the fall in global support of women's entrepreneurship. In September 2017, Trump delivered an anti-human trafficking speech at the United Nations General Assembly, calling it "the greatest human rights issue of our time". The event was hosted by then British prime minister Theresa May, who personally invited Trump to participate, in collaboration with Great Britain and Ireland.

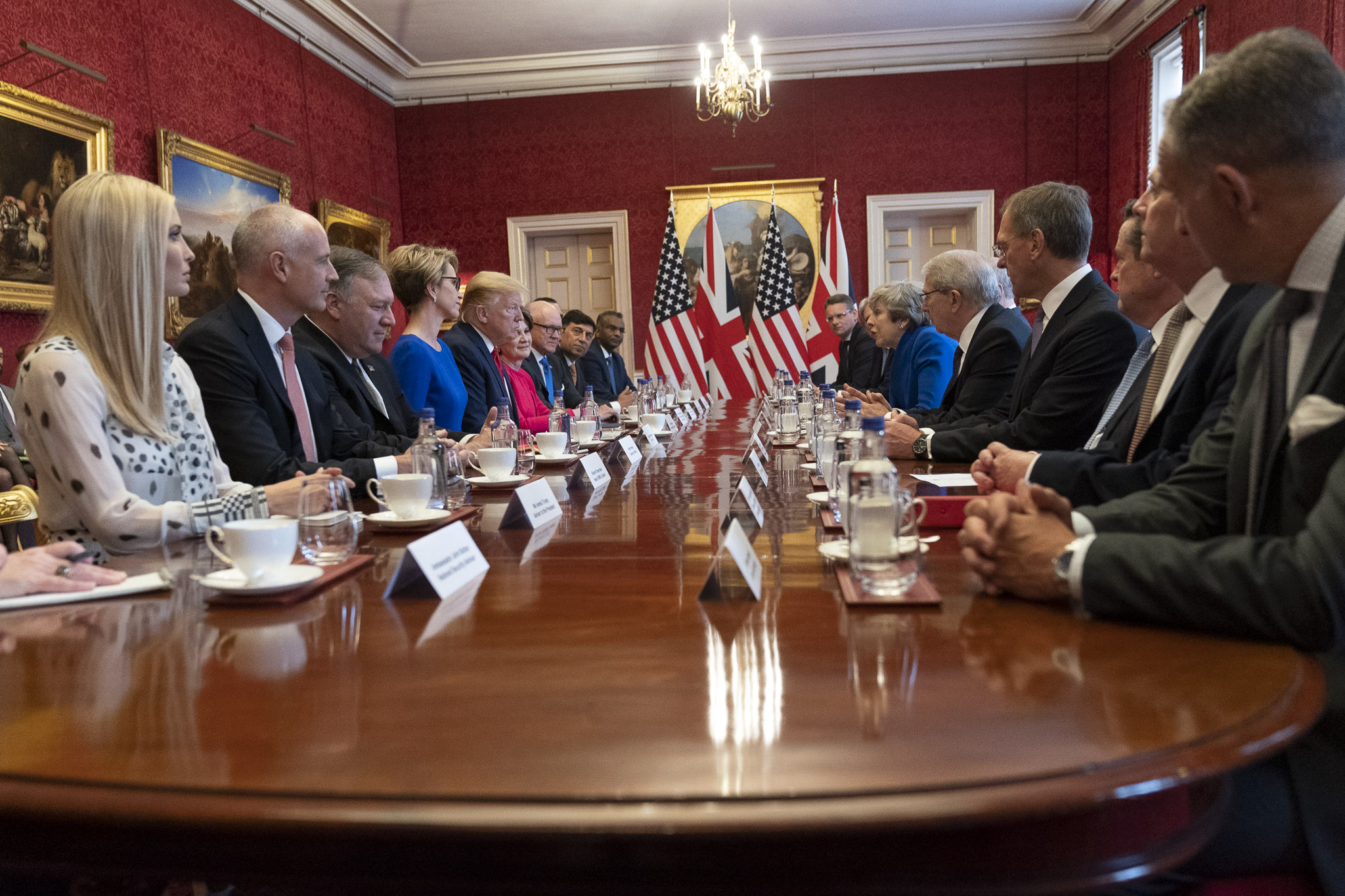
President Trump, Ivanka and British prime minister Theresa May attend a business roundtable event at St James's Palace in London, June 4, 2019.

Trump led the United States presidential delegation to the 2018 PyeongChang Olympic Winter Games closing ceremony in February 2018. She dined with South Korean President Moon Jae-in at his residence, the Blue House.

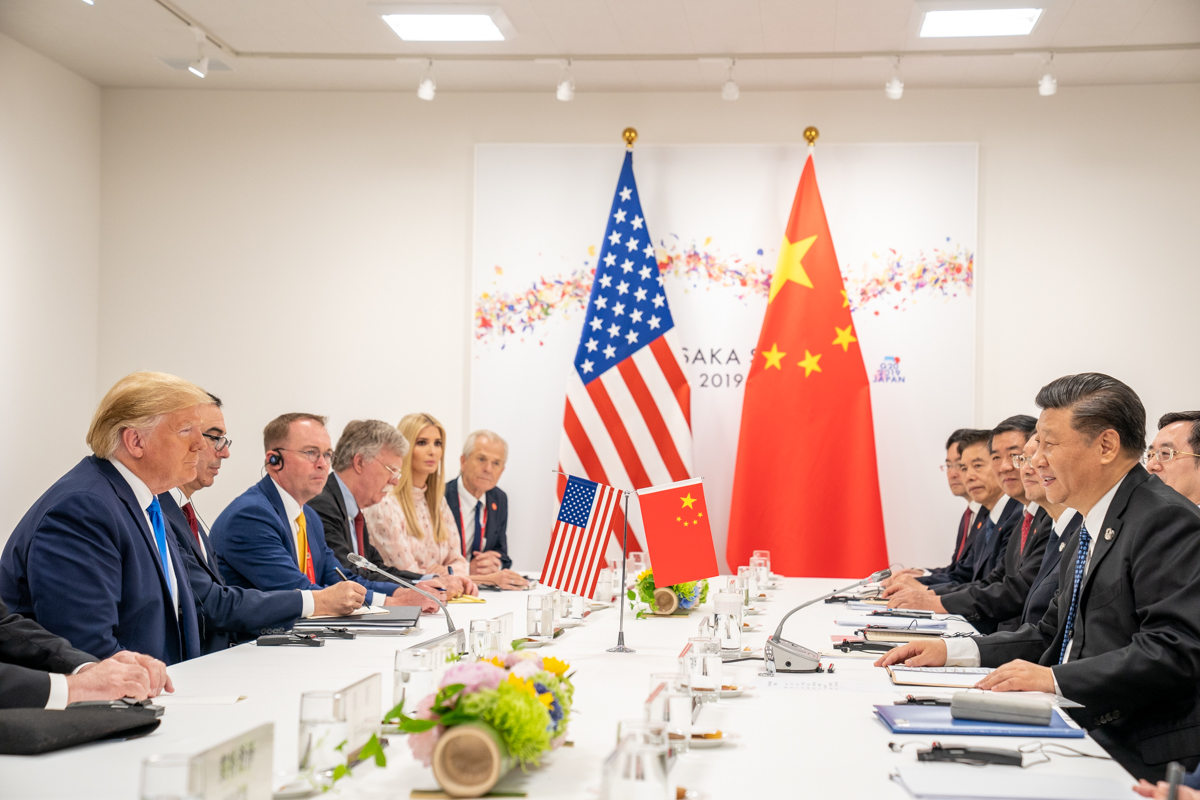
President Trump, Ivanka and Chinese leader Xi Jinping at the G20 Summit in Osaka, June 28, 2019

She and her father attended the 2019 G20 Osaka summit summit.

After the G20 Summit in Osaka in June 2019, Trump joined President Trump to meet with the North Korean leader Kim Jong-un inside the Korean peninsula's demilitarized zone. She described the experience as "surreal".

In 2019 to advance her "Women's Global Development and Prosperity Initiative", and advocate for changes in laws to allow women to freely participate in the economy, Trump visited countries receiving US development assistance including Ethiopia, Ivory Coast, Argentina, Colombia, Paraguay, and Morocco, as well as attended the 74th United Nations General Assembly.

The Women's Global Development and Prosperity Initiative (W-GDP) also aimed to increase access to vocational training, capital, and networks for women in the workforce, and remove limits on women's economic participation. The two houses of Congress introduced bipartisan bills to attempt to codify the initiative.

Trump advocated for doubling the child tax credit as a part of the 2017 Tax Cuts and Jobs Act and to increase money for states receiving child care and development block grants.

Trump backed a bill to fund paid family and medical leave for federal employees, which was passed by the Senate in December 2019.

She supported passage of the Fight Online Sex Trafficking Act (HR 1865), which passed through both houses of Congress and was signed into law by President Trump in 2019.

In January 2020, Trump organized a Human Trafficking Summit at the White House where President Trump signed an executive order expanding his domestic policy office with a new position solely focused on combating human trafficking. In June 2020, Trump hosted an event at the White House with the Attorney General William Barr, special advisor Heather C. Fischer, non-profit leaders, and survivors of human trafficking to announce $35 million in grant funding to aid victims of human trafficking.

In September 2020, Trump joined William Barr, the governor of Georgia Brian Kemp, the first lady of Georgia Marty Kemp, and Tim Tebow in Atlanta to announce $100 million in grant funding for human trafficking.

While serving in her father's administration, Trump retained ownership of businesses, which drew criticism from government ethics experts who said it created conflicts of interest. It is not possible to determine the exact amount of Trump's outside income while working in her father's administration because she is only required to report the worth of her assets and liabilities in ranges to the Office of Government Ethics. The incomes of Trump and her husband Jared Kushner ranged from $36.2 million to $157 million in 2019, at least $29 million in 2018, and at least $82 million in 2017. In 2019, she earned $3.9 million from her stake in the Trump hotel in Washington, D.C.

=== 2020 presidential campaign ===
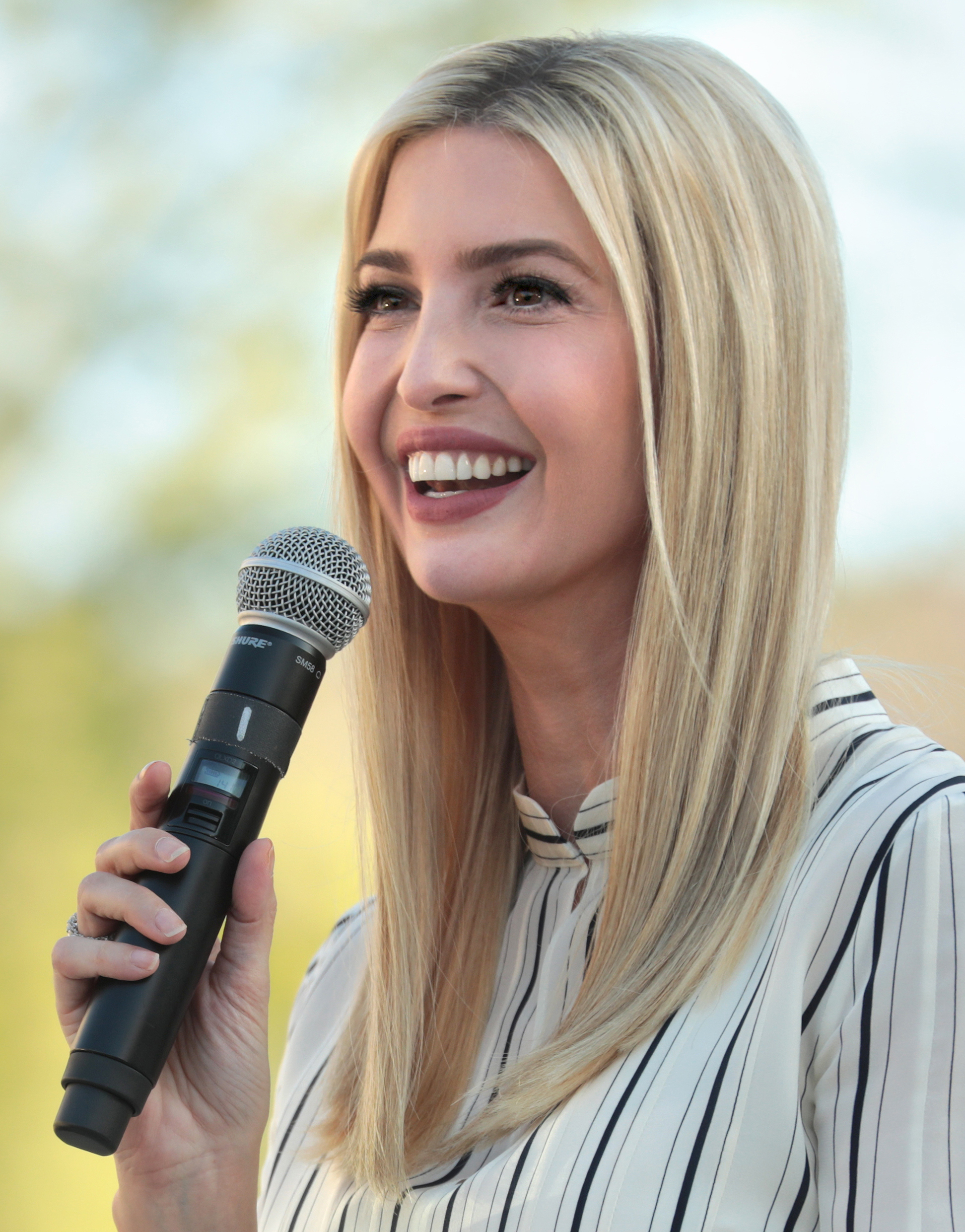
Campaigning for her father in October 2020

In August 2020, Trump introduced her father at the 2020 Republican National Convention, by which he proceeded on the front lawn of the White House to accept the party's nomination before a crowd of supporters.

=== Capitol riot and post-presidential career ===
Trump refused to address the rally at the Ellipse on January 6, 2021, but was in attendance. During the ensuing riot at the U.S. Capitol, she encouraged her father to make a video on Twitter condemning the riots.

In June 2022, Trump told the panel of the United States House Select Committee on the January 6 Attack that she did not believe the election was stolen and accepted William Barr's conclusion that voter fraud claims have "zero basis".

== Social and political causes ==
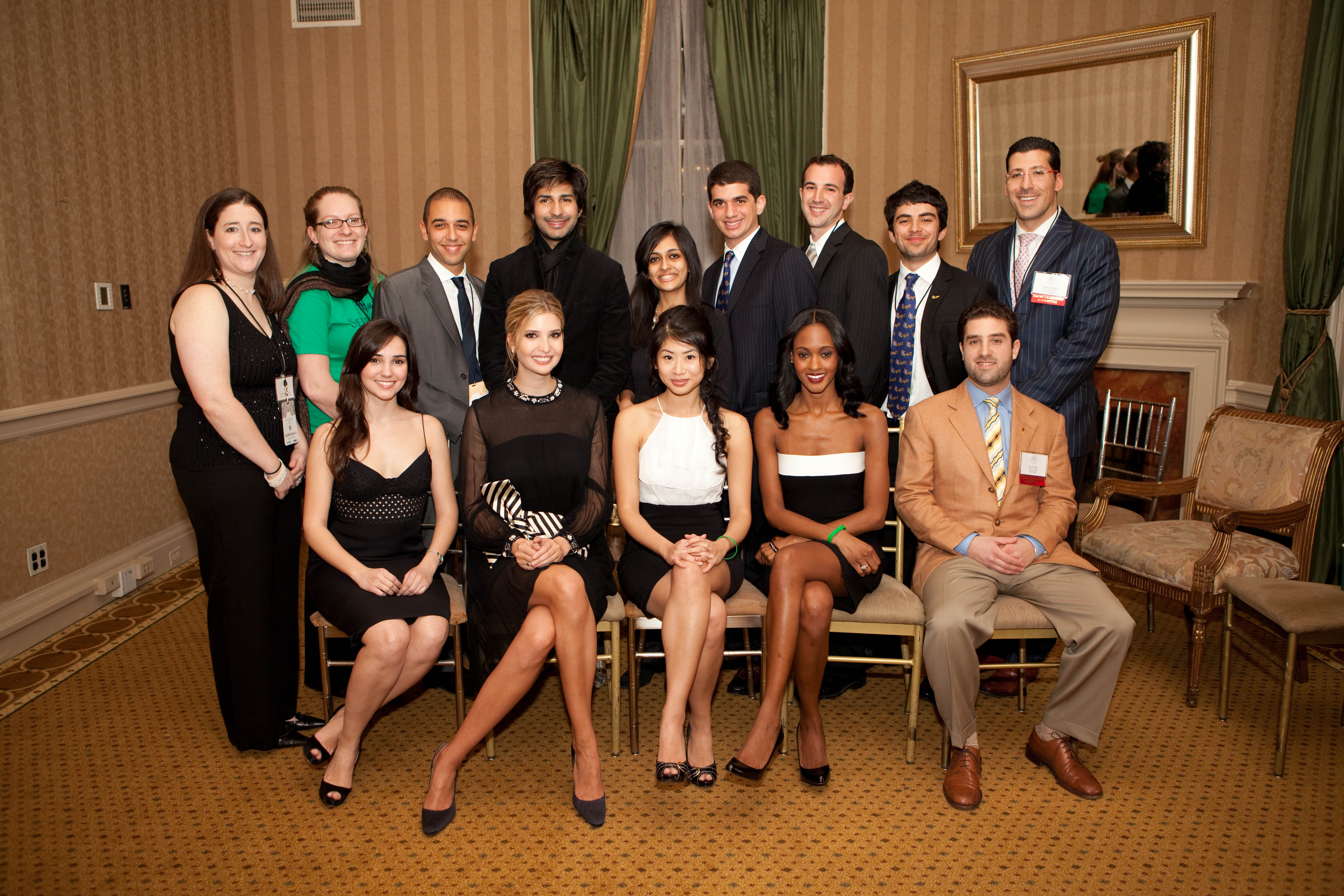
Trump (second from left in first row) at Seeds of Peace in New York City in 2009

In 2007, Trump donated $1,000 to the presidential campaign of then-Senator Hillary Clinton. In 2012, she endorsed Mitt Romney's presidential campaign. In 2013, Trump and her husband hosted a fundraiser for the Democratic politician Cory Booker, and the couple bundled more than $40,000 for Booker's U.S. Senate campaign.

During her father's presidency, Trump transformed from a liberal to an "unapologetically" pro-life, "proud Trump Republican". At the 2016 Republican National Convention, she said of her political views: "Like many of my fellow millennials, I do not consider myself categorically Republican or Democrat." In 2018, Trump changed her New York voter registration from Democratic to Republican.

=== Philanthropy ===
In 2010, Trump cofounded Girl Up with the United Nations Foundation. In 2014, Trump launched IvankaTrump.com and the Women Who Work campaign which focused on young, modern professional women, aiming to provide a comprehensive lifestyle guide.

Trump also has ties to a number of Jewish charities, including Chai Lifeline, a charity which helps to look after children with cancer. Other charities she supports include United Hatzalah, to which her father, Donald Trump, has reportedly made six-figure donations in the past. After she was appointed advisor to the president, Trump donated the unpaid half of the advance payments for her book Women Who Work: Rewriting the Rules for Success to the National Urban League and the Boys and Girls Clubs of America.

In 2021 and 2022, Trump partnered with Chobani CEO Hamdi Ulukaya to launch a privately funded holiday food box program that delivered millions of meals nationwide.

Trump collaborated with the nonprofit organizations CityServe, City of Destiny, and Mercy Chefs to supply a million meals to Ukrainian families in March 2022. In December that year, she purchased generators for CityServe's partner churches in Ukraine that were without power. That same year, alongside healthcare industry leaders, she organized five cargo planes of requested medical supplies for Ukraine with the support of the first lady of Poland and the Polish ambassador to the UN.

== Personal life ==
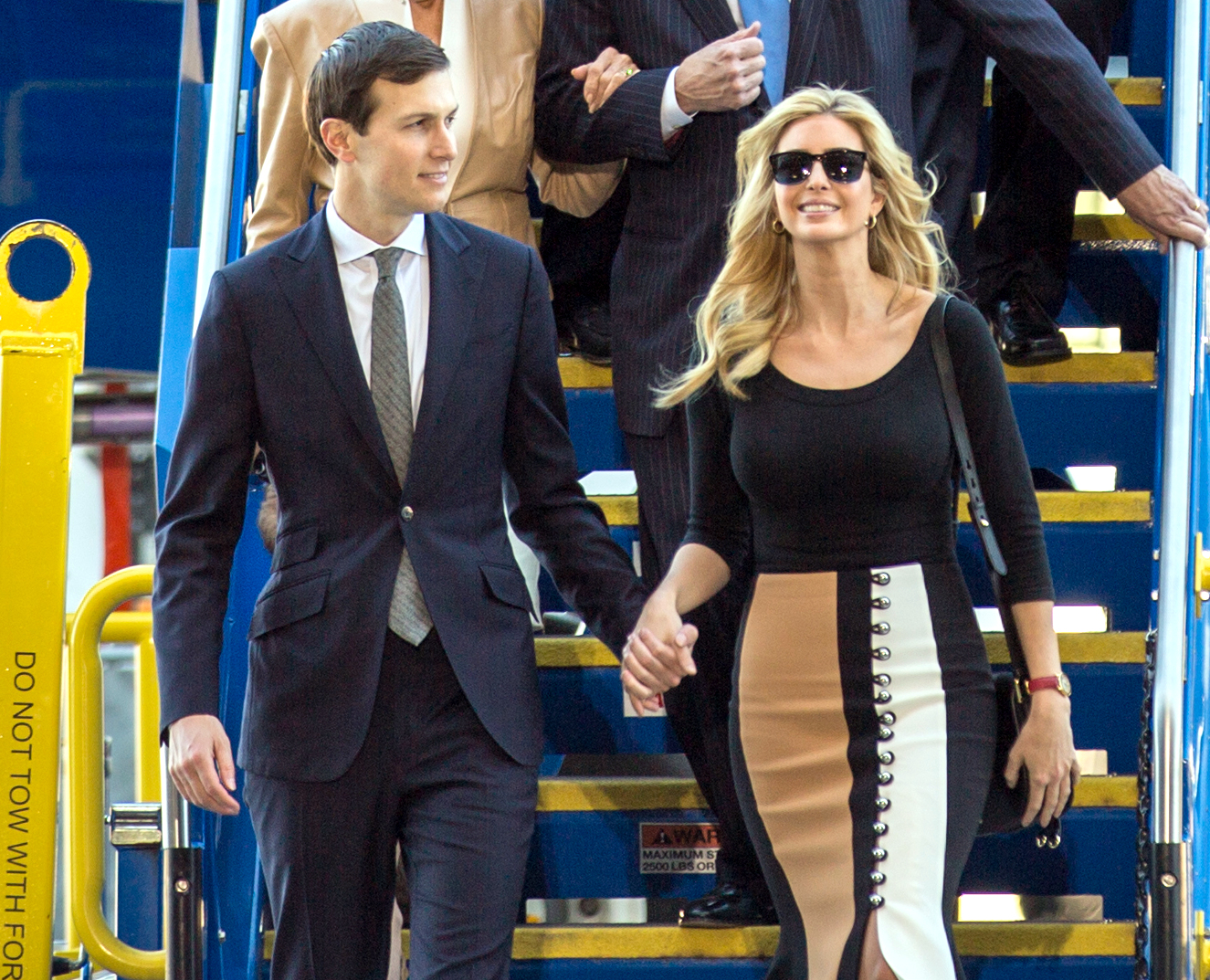
With Kushner at an event in North Charleston, South Carolina in February 2017

Trump has a close relationship with her father, who has publicly expressed his admiration for her on several occasions. Ivanka has likewise praised her father, complimenting his leadership skills and saying he empowers other people. Sarah Ellison, writing for Vanity Fair in 2018, noted that "everyone in the family seems to acknowledge" that Ivanka is her father's "favorite" child. This had been confirmed by the family members themselves in a 2015 interview with Barbara Walters on network television where the siblings were gathered and acknowledged this. According to her late mother, Ivanka speaks French and understands Czech.

In January 2017 it was announced that she and Kushner had made arrangements to establish a family home in the Kalorama neighborhood of Washington, D.C. The couple had previously shared an apartment on Park Avenue in New York City, which Trump chose due to its proximity to her work with the Trump Organization. The residence was featured in Elle Decor in 2012 with Kelly Behun as its interior decorator. Since leaving Washington in 2021, Ivanka and her husband have been residents of Surfside, Florida.

Trump began practicing Brazilian jiu-jitsu under the Valente brothers alongside her husband and children. She enjoys golf, surfing, and horseback riding, and has learned to play both the piano and guitar.

=== Relationships and marriage ===
Trump was in a nearly four-year relationship with Greg Hersch while in college. From 2001 to 2005, she dated James "Bingo" Gubelmann. In 2005, she started dating real estate developer Jared Kushner, whom she met through mutual friends. The couple broke up in 2008 but reconciled and married in a Jewish ceremony on 25 October 2009. They have three children: a daughter born in July 2011, and two sons born in October 2013 and March 2016 respectively. In an interview on The Dr. Oz Show, Trump revealed that she had suffered from postpartum depression after each of her pregnancies.

=== Religion ===
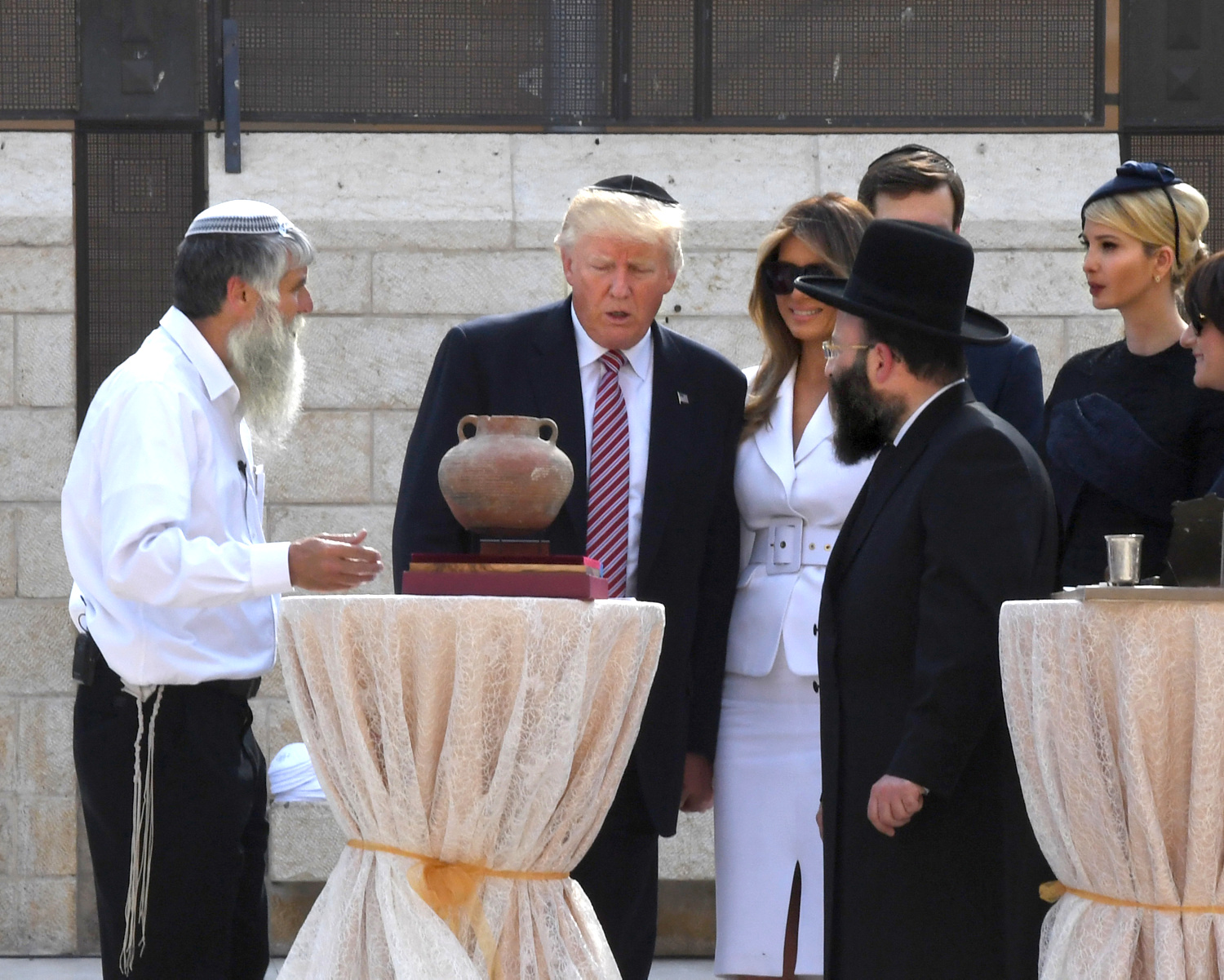
Trump (far right) with (from centre to right) her father, stepmother and husband at the Western Wall at Temple Mount in Jerusalem in May 2017

Raised Presbyterian, Trump converted to Judaism through Modern Orthodox Judaism in July 2009 after studying with Elie Weinstock of the Ramaz School. She adopted the Hebrew name Yael. She has described the conversion as a "beautiful journey" supported by her father from the outset.

Trump and her husband keep a kosher home and observe the Jewish Sabbath. Ahead of the 2016 presidential election, the couple visited the grave of the Lubavitcher Rebbe to pray. In May 2017, they joined her father on his presidential visit to Israel, including a stop at the Western Wall.

== Recognition ==
In 2012, the Wharton Club of New York, the official Wharton alumni association for the New York metropolitan area, gave Trump the Joseph Wharton Award for Young Leadership, one of their four annual awards for alumni. In 2014, Trump was named to Fortune’s ’40 Under 40’ list.

In 2014, Fortune magazine included Trump in their 40 Under 40 list. In 2015, she was honored as a Young Global Leader by the World Economic Forum, Time magazine listed her as one of the most influential people in the world in 2017.

In January 2020, Trump received the "Friend of Israel Award" from the Israeli-American Council. The same year she was honored with the National Association of Manufacturers' Alexander Hamilton Award.

== Cultural depictions ==
Men dressed as Trump have attended protests against her father Donald Trump. On Saturday Night Live, Trump has been portrayed by cast member Vanessa Bayer, as well as the guest hosts Margot Robbie, Emily Blunt, and Scarlett Johansson. Former cast member Maya Rudolph, who played Trump on the show in 2005, impersonated her again on Late Night with Seth Meyers in 2017. Beyonce and Nikki Minaj’s “Flawless” remix included a shoutout to Trump. Trump has also been portrayed on The President Show (2017) and Last Week Tonight with John Oliver. Trump had a cameo in Gossip Girl in 2010. In the eleventh season of RuPaul's Drag Race, a satirical version of her was portrayed by Mercedes Iman Diamond in "Trump: The Rusical". Madame Tussauds has a wax sculpture of Trump. Jennifer Rubell's 2019 art exhibition Ivanka Vacuuming featured a model resembling Trump vacuuming crumbs thrown by spectators.
