= Margaret Vanderhye =

American politician

Margaret G. Vanderhye

Member of the Virginia House of Delegates from the 34th district
- In office January 9, 2008 – January 13, 2010
- Preceded by: Vince Callahan
- Succeeded by: Barbara Comstock

Personal details
- Born: July 29, 1948 (age 78) Chicago, Illinois, U.S.
- Party: Democratic
- Spouse: Robert Vanderhye
- Children: 2
- Education: Northwestern University (B.A.); Johns Hopkins University (M.A.)
- Profession: Civic leader
- Committees: Agriculture, Chesapeake and Natural Resources; Science and Technology

Margaret G. "Margi" Vanderhye (born July 29, 1948, in Chicago) is a McLean, Virginia community activist and a former delegate from the 34th district of Virginia. She was the Democratic nominee in the 2007 Virginia general election to fill the seat held by retiring incumbent Republican Vince Callahan, defeating Republican businessman Dave Hunt in the general election on November 6, 2007. On November 3, 2009, Vanderhye was narrowly defeated in her reelection bid by Republican Barbara Comstock.

== Background ==
Vanderhye, a longtime resident of McLean, earned her B.A. in political science from Northwestern University and a master's degree in economics and international relations from the Johns Hopkins School of Advanced International Studies. Early in her career she worked for Brent Scowcroft at the National Security Council and did a stint as a research consultant at the Brookings Institution in Washington, D.C. Starting in the 1990s, she began to work as a political appointee in the area of development and transportation. Virginia Governor Doug Wilder appointed Vanderhye to the state's Commission on Population Growth and Development and to a four-year term (1992–1996) on the Chesapeake Bay Local Assistance Board. During the Wilder administration, she was also the Chair of the Citizens Advisory Committee for the state's Transportation Coordinating Council. From 1989 to 1991, she was president of the Virginia Association of Planning District Commissions.

In 1995, President Bill Clinton appointed her to the National Capital Planning Commission where she chaired the Commission's Joint Memorials Task Force which developed a master plan for monuments, memorials, and museums in the national capital area. She also served on the NCPC's Interagency Security Task Force and was the Commission's designated representative to the Transportation Planning Board.

In 2002, Virginia Governor Mark Warner appointed Vanderhye to the Northern Virginia Transportation Authority. She was reappointed to the Authority by Gov. Tim Kaine. During her two terms on the NVTA, she helped develop the Authority's "2030 TransAction Plan," a blueprint for regional transportation priorities for the next two decades.

Vanderhye's local activities have focused on children and schools. In 1995, she conceived a cooperative community initiative called "Project Hospitality" to discourage hotels from providing high school students with rooms for after-prom parties. In 1998, the program received an award from the Fairfax County Board of Supervisors and has been replicated throughout the region. In 2005, she joined the advisory board of Our Military Kids, a non-profit organization that supports school age children of National Guard and Reserve personnel deployed in Iraq and Afghanistan.

Vanderhye has long been active in Democratic Party politics, volunteering on numerous national, state, and local campaigns. She is a 1990 graduate of Leadership Fairfax. She is a graduate of the Sorensen Institute for Political Leadership at the University of Virginia.

She is married to Robert A. Vanderhye, an attorney and energy specialist. They have two children.

== 2007 campaign ==
Vanderhye officially began her campaign for the Virginia House of Delegates on November 14, 2006, with a fundraiser in McLean. Another McLean resident, Richard "Rip" Sullivan, a lawyer with the firm Reed Smith, also sought the Democratic Party nomination for the seat which had been held by Republican Vince Callahan since 1968. In an open primary on June 12, 2007, Vanderhye defeated Sullivan, winning 52% of 3,304 votes cast. The Republican Party nominee for the seat was Dave Hunt, a McLean resident and businessman who previously served as legislative assistant to the retiring incumbent. The Virginia Democratic Party targeted the race as a potential pick-up, based on the trend in the last several elections in which democratic candidates for governor and United States Senate won majorities in the district.

== 2009 campaign ==
Vanderhye declared her intention to run for reelection and was not opposed in a party primary. The Republican Party nominee for the seat was Barbara Comstock, a McLean resident and political consultant who previously served as Director of the Office of Public Affairs for the U.S. Department of Justice. The race was among the most expensive (in terms of money spent) of the Virginia House of Delegates elections in 2009. Vanderhye lost the election.

== Election results ==
Virginia State House District 34, 2007
Party	Candidate	Votes	%	±%
Republican	Dave Hunt	8,621	48.43	
Democratic	Margaret Vanderhye	9,161	51.46	

Virginia State House District 34, 2009
Party	Candidate	Votes	%	±%
Republican	Barbara Comstock	11,436	50.64	
Democratic	Margaret Vanderhye	11,120	49.24	
