= Virginia's 34th House of Delegates district =

Virginia legislative district

Virginia's 34th State House of Delegates district
- District map from the 2023 election
Delegate
Tony Wilt; R–Broadway
- Demographics: 70% White; 5% Black; 18% Hispanic; 3% Asian; 0% Native American; 0% Hawaiian/Pacific Islander; 0% Other; 3% Multiracial
- Population (2024) • Voting age: 87,521; 18
- Registered voters: 52,452

Virginia's 34th House of Delegates district elects one of 100 seats in the Virginia House of Delegates, the lower house of the state's bicameral legislature. District 34 currently represents the city of Harrisonburg and part of Rockingham County in the Shenandoah Valley. The district is currently represented by Republican Tony Wilt.

== Electoral history ==
=== 2013 ===
In the 2013 general election, Republican incumbent Barbara Comstock was challenged by Democrat Kathleen Murphy, a former Clinton administration official in the U.S. Department of Commerce. Comstock edged out Murphy, winning re-election by 258 votes.

=== 2015 ===
Incumbent Comstock was elected to Congress in November 2014, vacating her House of Delegates seat and prompting a special election on January 6, 2015. In another close contest, Democrat Murphy defeated Republican Craig Parisot by 326 votes. In the November general election, the same candidates ran again. Murphy won re-election by 188 votes.

=== 2017 ===
Murphy was re-elected with 61% of the vote, defeating Republican Cheryl Buford.

=== 2019 ===
Challenged by Republican Gary Pan, Murphy was re-elected with 58% of the vote.

== District officeholders ==
Years	Delegate	Party	Electoral history
January 13, 1982 – January 12, 1983	John Watkins	Republican	
January 12, 1983 – January 9, 2008	Vince Callahan	Republican	Declined to run for reelection
January 9, 2008 – January 13, 2010	Margaret Vanderhye	Democratic	Defeated in bid for reelection
January 13, 2010 – November 10, 2014	Barbara Comstock	Republican	Resigned; elected to the US House of Representatives
January 13, 2015 – January 10, 2024	Kathleen Murphy	Democratic	Elected via special election
January 10, 2024 - present	Tony Wilt	Republican	
