= Dranesville, Virginia =

- Census-designated place
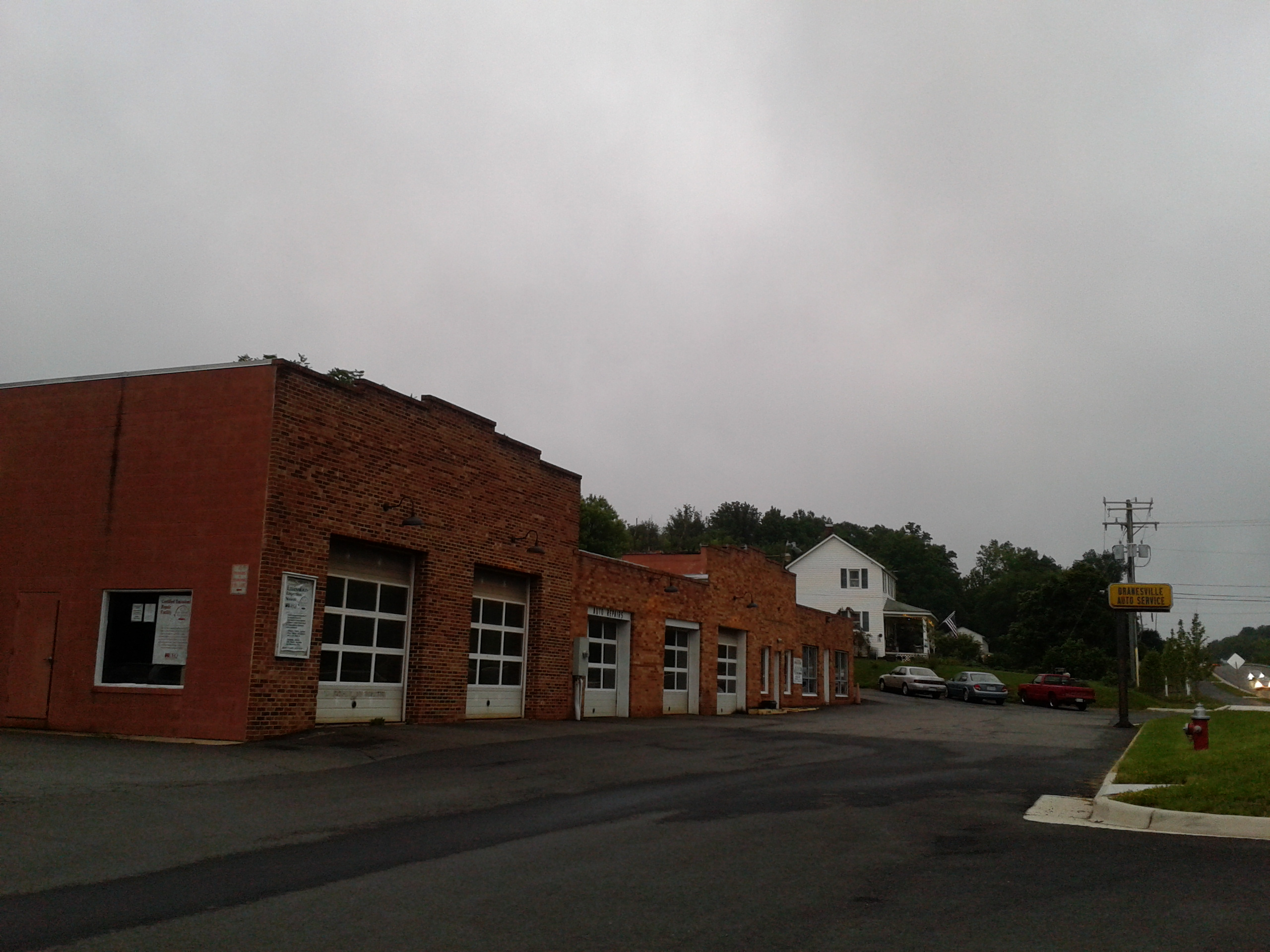
- Storefronts and houses along Leesburg Pike in Dranesville

- Location within Northern Virginia Location within Virginia Location within the United States
- Coordinates: 38°59′52″N 77°21′49″W
- Country: United States
- State: Virginia
- County: Fairfax

Area
  - Total: 3.87 sq mi (10.03 km^{2})
  - Land: 3.84 sq mi (9.95 km^{2})
  - Water: 0.031 sq mi (0.08 km^{2})
- Elevation: 350 ft (110 m)

Population (2020)
  - Total: 11,785
  - Density: 3,068/sq mi (1,184.4/km^{2})
- Time zone: UTC−5 (Eastern (EST))
  - Summer (DST): UTC−4 (EDT)
- FIPS code: 51-23392
- GNIS feature ID: 2584837

Dranesville is a census-designated place (CDP) in Fairfax County, Virginia, United States. Dranesville is located on the Leesburg Pike (State Route 7) at its intersection with Georgetown Pike (State Route 193). The U.S. Census Bureau defines Dranesville as a census-designated place (CDP) with a population of 11,921 as of 2010. At the 2020 Census the population was 11,785.

The town is named for Washington Drane, a settler who moved there in 1810. Recognizing the traffic that would come to the intersection of two main roads, Drane began operating a combination hotel, tavern and store, which he named Drane's Tavern. Dranesville Tavern still stands and is listed on the National Register of Historic Places.

== Geography ==
The CDP is located in northern Fairfax County and is bounded by Route 7 to the northeast, the Loudoun County line to the northwest, the town of Herndon to the southwest, and Reston to the southeast. The original settlement of Dranesville, at the intersection of Routes 7 and 193, is at the northeast corner of the CDP. Washington, D.C. is 23 miles (37 km) to the southeast down Route 7 and I-66, and Leesburg is 13 miles (21 km) to the northwest on Route 7. Washington Dulles International Airport is 9 miles (14 km) to the southwest.

According to the U.S. Census Bureau, the Dranesville CDP has a total area of 3.87 square miles (10.03 km^{2}), of which 3.84 square miles (9.95 km^{2}) is land and 0.03 square miles (0.08 km^{2}), or 0.77%, is water.

== Demographics ==
Historical population
Census	Pop.	Note	%±
2010	11,921		—
2020	11,785		−1.1%
U.S. Decennial Census; 2010 2020

Dranesville was first listed as a census designated place in the 2010 U.S. census formed from part of Reston CDP and additional area).

=== Racial and ethnic composition ===
Dranesville CDP, Virginia – Racial and ethnic composition Note: the US Census treats Hispanic/Latino as an ethnic category. This table excludes Latinos from the racial categories and assigns them to a separate category. Hispanics/Latinos may be of any race.
Race / Ethnicity (NH = Non-Hispanic)	Pop 2010	Pop 2020	% 2010	% 2020
White alone (NH)	8,597	7,757	72.12%	65.82%
Black or African American alone (NH)	492	486	4.13%	4.12%
Native American or Alaska Native alone (NH)	13	8	0.11%	0.07%
Asian alone (NH)	1,554	1,758	13.04%	14.92%
Native Hawaiian or Pacific Islander alone (NH)	8	9	0.07%	0.08%
Other race alone (NH)	38	84	0.32%	0.71%
Mixed race or Multiracial (NH)	371	632	3.11%	5.36%
Hispanic or Latino (any race)	848	1,051	7.11%	8.92%
Total	11,921	11,785	100.00%	100.00%

=== 2020 census ===
As of the 2020 census, Dranesville had a population of 11,785. The median age was 42.4 years. 22.7% of residents were under the age of 18 and 14.4% were 65 years of age or older. For every 100 females, there were 103.3 males, and for every 100 females age 18 and over, there were 98.5 males age 18 and over.

100.0% of residents lived in urban areas, while 0.0% lived in rural areas.

There were 3,861 households in Dranesville, of which 36.4% had children under the age of 18 living in them. Of all households, 75.3% were married-couple households, 8.3% were households with a male householder and no spouse or partner present, and 13.1% were households with a female householder and no spouse or partner present. About 11.2% of all households were made up of individuals, and 5.0% had someone living alone who was 65 years of age or older.

There were 3,926 housing units, of which 1.7% were vacant. The homeowner vacancy rate was 0.2%, and the rental vacancy rate was 6.2%.

=== Demographic estimates ===
According to the 2022 American Community Survey, the average family household had 3.39 people. The largest ancestry group was the 19.5% who had English ancestry, 19.1% spoke a language other than English at home, and 17.5% were born outside the United States, 75.8% of whom were naturalized citizens.

=== Income and poverty ===
The median income for a household in the CDP was $206,344, and the median income for a family was $217,019. 7.9% of the population were military veterans, and 78.3% had a bachelor's degree or higher. In the CDP, 3.1% of the population was below the poverty line, including 1.3% of those under the age of 18 and 2.8% of those aged 65 or over, with 2.1% of the population without health insurance.

== See also ==
- Battle of Dranesville, during the American Civil War
