= The Trump Card (book) =

2009 book by Ivanka Trump

The Trump Card: Playing to Win in Work and Life
- Author: Ivanka Trump
- Language: English
- Genre: Self-help
- Publisher: Touchstone
- Publication date: October 16, 2009
- Publication place: United States
- Pages: 256
- Awards: 9781439155646

The Trump Card: Playing to Win in Work and Life is a 2009 book by Ivanka Trump.

It is written as a self-help book aimed at helping women achieve success in work and life. In this book, Trump portrays her privilege and wealthy upbringing as a handicap, citing as an example the fact that she was unable to set up a lemonade stand as a child because the neighborhood she lived in was so posh that it had no foot traffic, which forced her to be innovative and sell lemonade to the family's household staff instead. Trump emphasizes the role of her family's influence on her, citing a story in which she was next in line to get a navel piercing with her friends while a student at Choate Rosemary Hall, but backed out last minute after receiving a call from her father which caused her to consider how the decision to get the piercing would reflect upon her family. She says that her looks and youth made people take her less seriously and underestimate her, while her family's background in the real estate field made people overestimate her knowledge and competence in the field - she cites these examples to make the point that her privilege was a disadvantage for her.

The book includes quotes and advice from various well-known acquaintances of hers, such as Roger Ailes and Andrew Cuomo. Trump says that she was catcalled by workers on her father's construction sites, and advises women to ignore such behavior that comes with the territory, and separate it from "real" sexual harassment. She stresses that perception is more important than reality, opining that "If someone perceives something to be true, it is more important than if it is in fact true."
