= Virginia State Route 193 =

State highway in northern Virginia, US

State Route 193
- Georgetown Pike

Route information
- Maintained by VDOT
- Length: 11.79 mi (18.97 km)
- Tourist routes: Virginia Byway

Major junctions
- West end: SR 7 in Dranesville
- I-495 in McLean
- East end: SR 123 in Langley

Location
- Country: United States
- State: Virginia

Highway system
- Virginia Routes; Interstate; US; Primary; Secondary; Byways; History; HOT lanes
← SR 192	→ SR 194
- Georgetown Pike
- U.S. National Register of Historic Places
- Virginia Landmarks Register
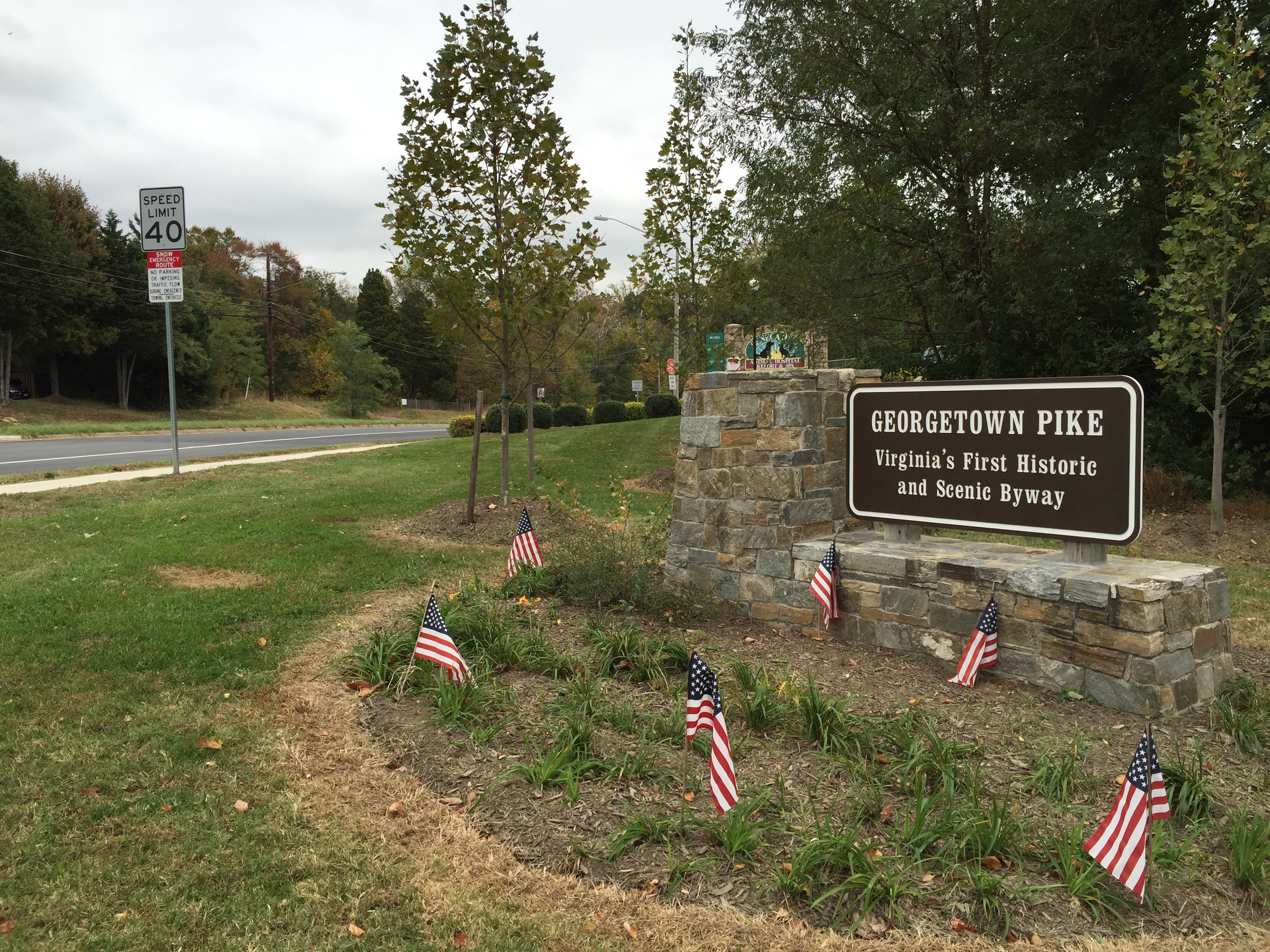
- Georgetown Pike sign commemorating its standing as the first historic and scenic byway in Virginia

- Location within Northern Virginia Location within Virginia Location within the United States
- Location: From DC/VA boundary at Chain Bridge to the junction with Leesburg Pike at Seneca Rd., near McLean, Virginia
- Coordinates: 38°57′23″N 77°11′56″W
- NRHP reference No.: 12000537
- VLR No.: 029-0466

Significant dates
- Added to NRHP: August 22, 2012
- Designated VLR: June 21, 2012

State Route 193 (SR 193) is a primary state highway in the U.S. state of Virginia. Known as Georgetown Pike, the state highway runs 11.79 mi (18.97 km) from SR 7 in Dranesville east to SR 123 in Langley. SR 193 passes through Great Falls and meets Interstate 495 (I-495) in McLean. The state highway was designated the first Virginia Byway for its scenic value in 1974.

== Route description ==
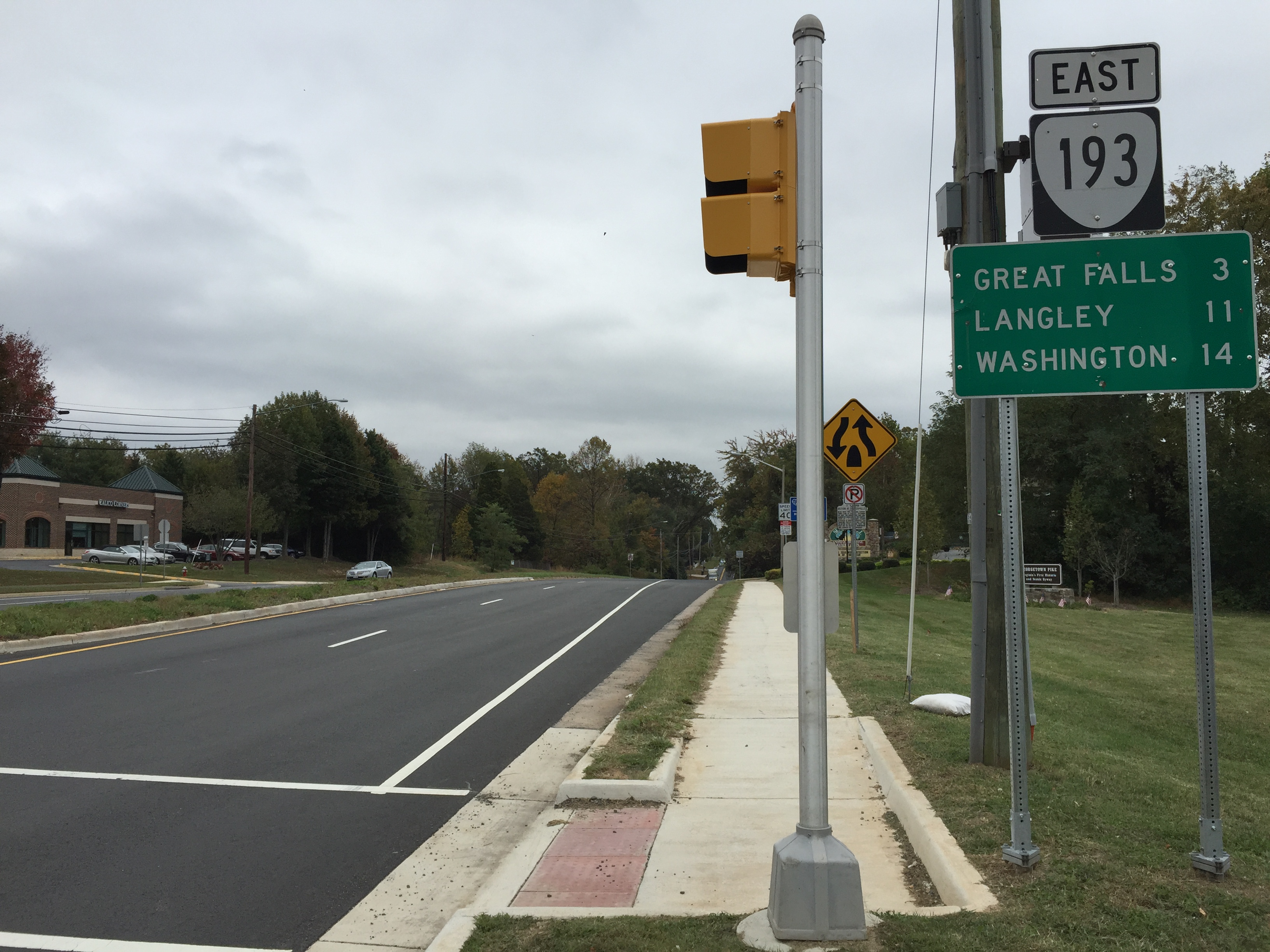
View east along SR 193 at SR 7 in Dranesville

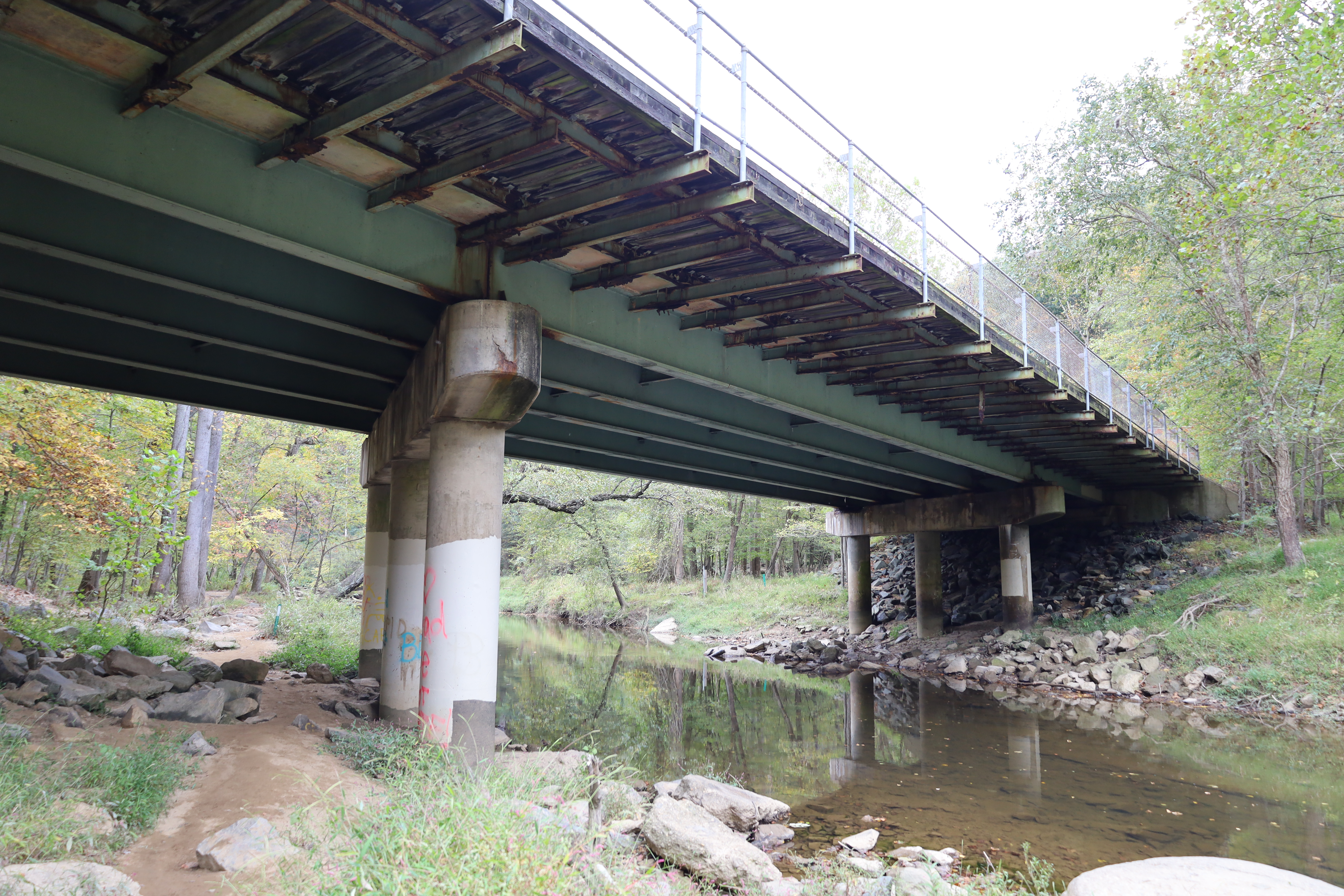
Crossing of Difficult Run at Great Falls Park

SR 193 begins at an intersection with SR 7 (Leesburg Pike) in Dranesville. The state highway heads east as a two-lane undivided road and passes between many of the affluent residential subdivisions of Great Falls. After passing through the village center of Great Falls at Walker Road, SR 193 turns east-southeast and follows the edge of Great Falls Park. The state highway features many sharp curves as it drops into the stream valley of Difficult Run. SR 193 passes through several curves as the highway skirts residential subdivisions, passes the Madeira School, and crosses Bullneck Run and Scott Run. The state highway temporarily expands to a four-lane divided highway around its interchange with I-495 (Capital Beltway) in McLean. After passing Langley High School and Chain Bridge Road, the old alignment of SR 123, SR 193 reaches its eastern terminus at SR 123 (Dolley Madison Boulevard).

== History ==
When first constructed, the Georgetown Pike continued through the District of Columbia's Alexandria County (now Arlington County, Virginia) to the banks of the Potomac. It was listed in the National Register of Historic Places in 1974.

The listing describes Georgetown Pike as located in both Fairfax and Arlington Counties, Virginia. Beginning at the boundary of the District of Columbia and Arlington County at Chain Bridge on the south bank of the Potomac River, it extends .4 miles to cross the Fairfax County line, then continues 14 miles in an approximately northwesterly direction to meet the Leesburg Pike near Dranesville in Fairfax County. After beginning the ascent from Chain Bridge, the river is never again visible from the road, although it passes so close to the river at Great Falls that the roar of the water can be heard. The Georgetown Pike roadbed is approximately 20- to 24-feet wide within a 50- to 60-foot-wide right-of-way as built in 1813–1827. A crowned and graduated stone highway, constructed according to a modified Tresaguet system, the Georgetown Pike surpassed the standards of the enabling legislation of both the U. S. Congress and the Assembly of Virginia. John Mason, Jr., president of the Falls Bridge Turnpike Company, wrote to the Board of Public Works in 1820 that the roadbed was "paved with large stone, closely fitted together, 12 inches deep in the centre, falling off to 6 inches on the sides, and covered with broken stone 6 inches deep from side to side; making 18 inches stone in the centre, and twelve inches on the sides; the whole is covered with sand, gravel or clay, as was found most convenient."1 This substantial method of construction has served the road well, as it has survived flooding, war, neglect, and adaptation for automobile traffic. The Georgetown Pike is a road built in conformance with the most advanced engineering expertise and construction resources of the early nineteenth century. Men using hand tools and horse-drawn equipment formed the roadbed, clearing, blasting, plowing, scooping, and filling the rough terrain. Stone retaining walls, culverts, arches, and bridges were built where necessary, working within the context of the natural terrain to the extent possible. An original road bridge with stone and brick viaduct at Bull Neck Run, and a massive stone retaining wall at Pimmit Run in Arlington County are notable survivors. John Templeman, builder of the Potomac Chain Bridge in 1808, served as superintendent of the road from December 1, 1817, to April 30, 1818. He designed and built an additional chain bridge to carry the Pike over Difficult Run. Though this bridge is not extant, it was described by Mason as "220 feet long, and 20 feet wide; it stands on two large stone abutments, and three stone piers 18 feet high; is further supported by three ranges of chains, extending from end to end, resting on the stone piers; and has supports of strong upright timbers between the piers where necessary."

From 1940 to 1963, Georgetown Pike's eastern terminus was at its intersection with Chain Bridge Road, which then continued east along the Pike's alignment to the Potomac. In 1963, Virginia completed the Dolley Madison Boulevard bypass in the McLean area, as an alternative to widening both the existing Chain Bridge Road and Georgetown Pike. John F. Kennedy, who owned the Hickory Hill property at the intersection of the two roads, requested the alignment south of his property. Georgetown Pike was then extended east along its previous alignment to the new boulevard, which kept the name Chain Bridge Road from there to the Potomac.

== Major intersections ==
The entire route is in Fairfax County.

Location	mi	km	Destinations	Notes
Dranesville	0.00	0.00	SR 7 (Leesburg Pike)	Western terminus
Fairview			SR 738 (Old Dominion Drive) – Great Falls Park, McLean	
River Oaks	9.28	14.93	I-495 – Rockville, Richmond	Exit 44 (I-495)
Langley	11.79	18.97	SR 123 (Dolley Madison Boulevard) – Washington, McLean	Eastern terminus
1.000 mi = 1.609 km; 1.000 km = 0.621 mi
