= INSPIRE Women Act =

Federal bill

- Other short titles: Inspiring the Next Space Pioneers, Innovators, Researchers, and Explorers Women Act
- Long title: An act to inspire women to enter the aerospace field, including science, technology, engineering, and mathematics, through mentorship and outreach.
- Enacted by: the 115th United States Congress
- Effective: 02/28/2017

Citations
- Public law: Pub. L. 115–7 (text) (PDF)

Legislative history
- Introduced in the House as H.R.321 by Rep. Barbara Comstock (R-VA) on 01/05/2017; Committee consideration by Science, Space and Technology (House) and Commerce, Science and Transportation (Senate); Passed the House on 01/10/2017 (Voice Vote); Passed the Senate on 02/14/2017 (Voice Vote); Signed into law by President Donald Trump on 2/28/2017

The INSPIRE Women Act (Pub. L. 115–7 (text) (PDF),H.R. 321) was introduced in the United States House of Representatives on January 5, 2017 by Representative Barbara Comstock of Virginia. The bill compels the director of the National Aeronautics and Space Administration (NASA) to encourage women and girls to pursue an education in the science, technology, engineering, and mathematics (STEM) fields.

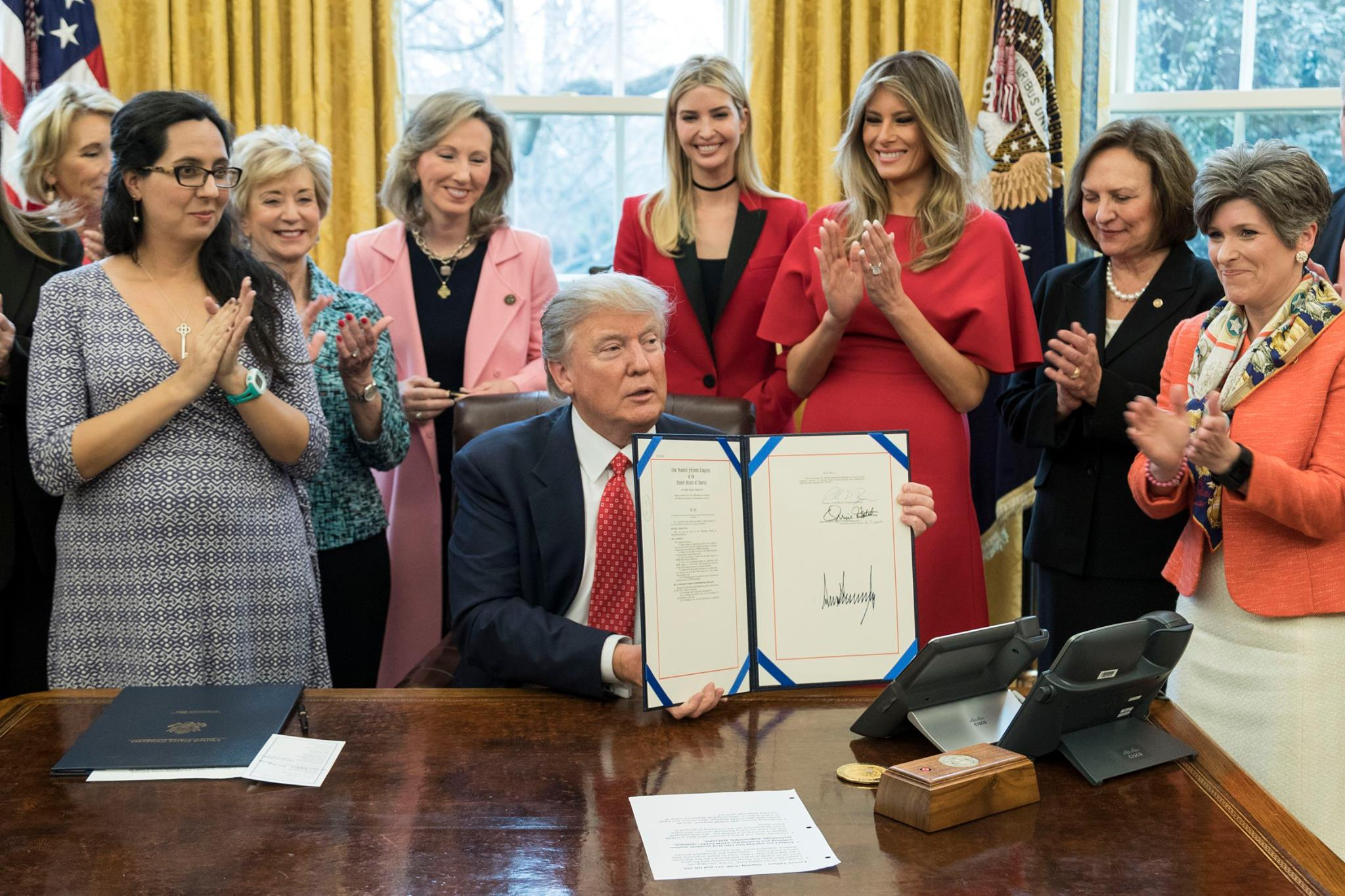
President Donald Trump holds up a newly signed INSPIRE Women Act on Tuesday, February 28, 2017, in the Oval Office of the White House.

The act additionally compels the NASA administrator to support the following initiatives:

- NASA GIRLS and NASA BOYS, which are virtual mentoring programs that pair NASA mentors with young students.
- Aspire to Inspire, a program that tasks young girls to investigate STEM career opportunities by providing information about the lives and jobs of early career women at NASA.
- Summer Institute in Science, Technology, Engineering, and Research. This program is designed to increase awareness of nontraditional career opportunities with the Goddard Space Flight Center among middle school students.

Lastly, the act requires the NASA administrator to present a report to the House Committee on Commerce, Science, and Transportation on how NASA can best engage current and retired astronauts, scientists, engineers, and other personnel to work with K-12 female STEM students to inspire the next generation of women to consider studying STEM fields and pursue careers in aerospace.

The bill was signed into law by President Donald Trump on February 28, 2017.
