= Vince Callahan =

American politician (1931–2014)

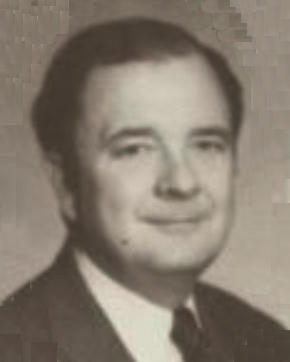

Member of the Virginia House of Delegates
- In office January 10, 1968 – January 9, 2008
- Preceded by: Larry Short
- Succeeded by: Margaret Vanderhye
- Constituency: 27th district (1968–1972); 18th district (1972–1982); 49th district (1982–1983); 34th district (1983–2008)

House Minority Leader
- In office January 13, 1982 – December 3, 1985
- Preceded by: Jerry H. Geisler
- Succeeded by: Andy Guest

Personal details
- Born: Vincent Francis Callahan Jr. October 30, 1931 Washington, D.C., U.S.
- Died: September 20, 2014 (aged 82) Arlington, Virginia, U.S.
- Party: Republican
- Spouses: Dorothy Budge; Yvonne Weight
- Education: Georgetown University (BS)

Military service
- Branch/service: United States Marine Corps; United States Coast Guard
- Years of service: 1950–1952 (USMC); 1959–1963 (USCG)
- Battles/wars: Korean War

Vincent Francis Callahan Jr. (October 30, 1931 – September 20, 2014) was an American politician who served for 40 years as a member of the Virginia House of Delegates. From January 1968 to January 2008, he represented the 34th district, which covers McLean, Great Falls, Tysons Corner, and parts of Herndon and Vienna. At the time of his retirement, he was the longest-serving Republican in the Virginia General Assembly.

== Early life ==
Callahan was born in 1931 in Washington, D.C. He served as a Marine in Korea from 1950 to 1952. He attended Georgetown University and earned a B.S. in Foreign Service in 1957. After serving four years as a lieutenant in the Coast Guard, he ran for Lieutenant Governor of Virginia in 1965, but lost to Fred G. Pollard. He ran for Delegate in 1967 and won. He was an unsuccessful candidate for the U.S. House of Representatives in 1976.

== House of Delegates ==
Callahan was first elected to the House of Delegates in 1967. In 1969, a Republican landslide year, Callahan, three other Republicans and Democrat Clive L. DuVal II, outpolled the second leading Democratic candidate Dorothy Shoemaker McDiarmid (who would be returned to the legislature in the next election). Callahan joined the Appropriations Committee in 1972; McDiarmid also served on that committee and served as its chair before her retirement in 1989.

Callahan was considered a moderate Republican and was relatively popular in his district. While he introduced legislation to restrict the death penalty to those 18 and older, Callahan introduced a bill to ban all stem-cell research in the Commonwealth of Virginia. He also introduced legislation in 2007 that would have increased the minimum wage in Virginia. He was awarded the Equality Public Servant Award by Equality Virginia, a gay-rights group which rarely supports Republicans.

Prior to 2007, he had last been challenged in 2001 by Dale Evans, a real estate agent, and won with 60.05% of the vote.

== 2007 election and retirement ==
As the only Republican state legislator within the Capital Beltway, Callahan was considered a target by Democrats keen to secure their hold on Northern Virginia. On March 6, 2007, Callahan announced that he would not run for re-election in November 2007.

Callahan endorsed his former legislative aide for appropriations, Dave Hunt, to succeed him, but Hunt lost to Margaret Vanderhye, the Democratic candidate, in the November election.

== Death ==
On September 20, 2014, Callahan died of West Nile virus at the age of 82.
