= National Register of Historic Places listings in Fairfax County, Virginia =

Location of Fairfax County in Virginia

This is a list of the National Register of Historic Places listings in Fairfax County, Virginia.

This is intended to be a complete list of the properties and districts on the National Register of Historic Places in Fairfax County, Virginia, United States. The locations of National Register properties and districts for which the latitude and longitude coordinates are included below, may be seen in an online map.

There are 69 properties and districts listed on the National Register in the county, including 4 National Historic Landmarks. Another property was once listed but has been removed.

This National Park Service list is complete through NPS recent listings posted May 1, 2026.

== Current listings ==
	Name on the Register	Image	Date listed	Location	City or town	Description
1	"A" Fort and Battery Hill Redoubt-Camp Early	"A" Fort and Battery Hill Redoubt-Camp Early	October 30, 1998 (#98001315)	Balmoral Greens Ave., 1 mile (1.6 km) south of the junction with Compton Rd. 38°47′22″N 77°25′40″W	Manassas Park	
2	Belvoir Mansion Ruins and the Fairfax Grave	Belvoir Mansion Ruins and the Fairfax Grave	June 4, 1973 (#73002337)	Southeast of the junction of 23rd St. and Belvoir Rd. 38°40′51″N 77°07′42″W	Fort Belvoir	
3	Bloomfield	Bloomfield	February 5, 2013 (#12001266)	12000 Leesburg Pike; 39°00′37″N 77°21′34″W	Herndon	
4	Bois Doré		December 7, 2020 (#100005880)	8008 Georgetown Pike; 38°57′40″N 77°13′20″W	McLean	
5	A. Smith Bowman Distillery	A. Smith Bowman Distillery	December 9, 1999 (#99001503)	1875 Old Reston Ave. 38°57′24″N 77°21′05″W	Reston	
6	Civil War Fort Sites	Civil War Fort Sites	July 15, 1974 (#74000274)	Arc of sites surrounding central Washington in Maryland, Virginia, and D.C. 38°56′02″N 77°07′34″W	McLean	At the outset of the Civil War in 1861, Washington became a critical target for rebel attacks but was virtually without protection. The Union Army hastily began construction of a fortified defense line around the city, the physical remnants of which encompass these 19 earthwork forts, including Fort Marcy. See also National Register listings in central D.C., western NW D.C., upper NW D.C., NE D.C., SE D.C., and Prince George's County, Maryland.
7	Clifton Historic District	Clifton Historic District	August 15, 1985 (#85001786)	Roughly bounded by Popes Head Creek, Water St., Dell Ave., and Chestnut and Chapel Rds. 38°46′46″N 77°23′11″W	Clifton	
8	Colvin Run Mill	Colvin Run Mill	August 16, 1977 (#77001487)	South of Great Falls at 10017 Colvin Run Rd. 38°58′07″N 77°17′35″W	Great Falls	
9	Cornwell Farm	Cornwell Farm	April 13, 1977 (#77001488)	Southeast of Great Falls, 9414 Georgetown Pike; 38°59′29″N 77°16′17″W	Great Falls	
10	D.C. Workhouse and Reformatory Historic District	D.C. Workhouse and Reformatory Historic District	February 16, 2006 (#06000052)	Between Silverbrook Rd., Lorton Rd., Ox Rd., and Furnace Rd. 38°41′53″N 77°15′16″W	Lorton	
11	Dranesville Tavern	Dranesville Tavern	November 9, 1972 (#72001393)	11919 Leesburg Pike; 39°00′29″N 77°21′37″W	Dranesville	
12	Drover's Rest		June 20, 2023 (#100009070)	8526 Georgetown Pk. 38°58′06″N 77°14′23″W	McLean	
13	Fairfax Arms	Fairfax Arms	May 21, 1979 (#79003037)	10712 Old Colchester Rd. 38°40′06″N 77°14′08″W	Colchester	
14	Floris Historic District	Floris Historic District	August 12, 2010 (#10000543)	Bounded by Centreville Rd., W. Ox Rd., Monroe St., and Frying Pan Branch; 38°56′11″N 77°24′35″W	Herndon	
15	Fort Hunt	Fort Hunt	March 26, 1980 (#80000353)	George Washington Memorial Parkway; 38°42′54″N 77°03′07″W	Alexandria	
16	Four Stairs	Four Stairs	August 11, 2004 (#04000842)	840 Leigh Mill Rd. 38°59′04″N 77°16′36″W	Great Falls	
17	Freeman Store	Freeman Store	May 16, 2012 (#11000834)	131 Church St., NE. 38°54′12″N 77°15′54″W	Vienna	
18	Frying Pan Meetinghouse	Frying Pan Meetinghouse	February 5, 1991 (#91000016)	2615 Centreville Rd. 38°56′24″N 77°24′47″W	Floris	
19	George Washington Memorial Parkway	George Washington Memorial Parkway	June 2, 1995 (#95000605)	Roughly the southern side of the Potomac River from the American Legion to the Memorial Bridge and the north side from Brickyard Rd. to the Chain Bridge; 38°57′38″N 77°08′54″W	Langley	
20	Georgetown Pike	Georgetown Pike	August 22, 2012 (#12000537)	From the District of Columbia boundary at the Chain Bridge to the junction with Leesburg Pike at Seneca Rd. 38°57′14″N 77°11′31″W	McLean	Extends into Arlington County
21	Great Falls Grange Hall and Forestville School	Great Falls Grange Hall and Forestville School	August 11, 2004 (#04000861)	9812 and 9818 Georgetown Pike; 38°59′52″N 77°17′08″W	Great Falls	
22	Great Falls Park Historic District	Great Falls Park Historic District	December 22, 2014 (#14001079)	Bounded by the Potomac River, Georgetown Pike, and River Bend Rd. 38°59′30″N 77°15′02″W	Great Falls	
23	Green Spring	Green Spring	October 22, 2003 (#03001089)	4601 Green Spring Rd. 38°49′28″N 77°09′26″W	Alexandria	
24	John Gunnell House	John Gunnell House	November 27, 2006 (#06001100)	489 Arnon Meadow Rd. 39°00′48″N 77°17′23″W	Great Falls	
25	William Gunnell House	William Gunnell House	May 22, 2003 (#03000447)	600 Insbruck Ave. 39°00′13″N 77°17′05″W	Great Falls	
26	Gunston Hall	Gunston Hall	October 15, 1966 (#66000832)	10709 Gunston Rd. 38°39′51″N 77°09′37″W	Mason Neck	
27	Herndon Depot	Herndon Depot	June 18, 1979 (#79003039)	Elden St. 38°58′13″N 77°23′12″W	Herndon	
28	Herndon Historic District	Herndon Historic District	January 11, 1991 (#90002121)	Roughly bounded by Locust, Spring, Pearl, Monroe, Station, and Vine Sts. 38°58′06″N 77°23′05″W	Herndon	
29	Hollin Hills Historic District	Hollin Hills Historic District	September 30, 2013 (#13000807)	Roughly Beechwood, Elba, Glasgow, Martha's, Paul Springs, Range, and Stafford Rds., and Mason Hill, Rebecca, and Whiteoaks Drs. 38°45′24″N 77°04′02″W	Alexandria	
30	Holmes Run Acres Historic District	Holmes Run Acres Historic District	March 22, 2007 (#07000230)	Generally bounded by Gallows Rd., Surrey Ln, and Holmes Run Dr. 38°51′09″N 77°12′38″W	Falls Church	
31	Hope Park Mill and Miller's House	Hope Park Mill and Miller's House	August 15, 1977 (#77001486)	12124 Pope's Head Rd. 38°48′55″N 77°21′56″W	Fairfax	
32	Huntley	Huntley	November 3, 1972 (#72001392)	6918 Harrison Lane; 38°45′56″N 77°05′41″W	Alexandria	
33	Langley Fork Historic District	Langley Fork Historic District	October 19, 1982 (#82001818)	Junction of Georgetown Pike and Old Chain Bridge Rd. 38°56′46″N 77°09′36″W	Langley	
34	Lake Anne Village Center Historic District	Lake Anne Village Center Historic District	June 5, 2017 (#100001041)	North Shore Dr. and Washington Plaza W. and N. 38°58′08″N 77°20′27″W	Reston	
35	Lexington	Lexington	May 28, 2013 (#13000336)	7301 High Point Rd. 38°39′37″N 77°10′28″W	Lorton	
36	Manassas National Battlefield Park	Manassas National Battlefield Park	October 15, 1966 (#66000039)	Northwest of Manassas off State Route 215; 38°49′28″N 77°30′12″W	Manassas	
37	Merrybrook	Merrybrook	April 26, 2007 (#07000362)	2346 Centreville Rd. 38°57′14″N 77°24′30″W	Herndon	
38	Mount Vernon	Mount Vernon	October 15, 1966 (#66000833)	7 miles (11 km) south of Alexandria on the George Washington Memorial Parkway; 38°42′29″N 77°05′10″W	Alexandria	
39	Mount Vernon Enterprise Lodge #3488-Pride of Fairfax County Lodge #298	Mount Vernon Enterprise Lodge #3488-Pride of Fairfax County Lodge #298	April 14, 2022 (#100007613)	7809 Fordson Rd. 38°44′47″N 77°04′51″W	Alexandria vicinity	
40	Mount Vernon High School	Mount Vernon High School	May 11, 2018 (#100002439)	8333 Richmond Highway; 38°43′53″N 77°06′06″W	Alexandria	The 1939 building, not the current school.
41	Mount Vernon Memorial Highway	Mount Vernon Memorial Highway	May 18, 1981 (#81000079)	Washington St. and the George Washington Memorial Parkway; 38°46′30″N 77°03′07″W	McLean	The portion of the George Washington Memorial Parkway from the Arlington Memorial Bridge to Mount Vernon
42	Northwest No. 1 Boundary Marker of the Original District of Columbia	Northwest No. 1 Boundary Marker of the Original District of Columbia	February 1, 1991 (#91000003)	3607 Powhatan St. 38°54′12″N 77°09′33″W	McLean	
43	Northwest No. 2 Boundary Marker of the Original District of Columbia	Northwest No. 2 Boundary Marker of the Original District of Columbia	February 1, 1991 (#91000004)	5145 N. 38th St. 38°54′49″N 77°08′46″W	McLean	
44	Northwest No. 3 Boundary Marker of the Original District of Columbia	Northwest No. 3 Boundary Marker of the Original District of Columbia	February 1, 1991 (#91000005)	4013 N. Tazewell St. 38°55′28″N 77°07′55″W	McLean	
45	Oak Hill	Oak Hill	May 19, 2004 (#04000478)	4716 Wakefield Chapel Rd. 38°49′15″N 77°14′24″W	Annandale	
46	Oakton Trolley Station	Oakton Trolley Station	February 8, 1995 (#95000026)	2923 Gray St. 38°52′46″N 77°17′49″W	Oakton	
47	Orange and Alexandria Railroad Bridge Piers	Orange and Alexandria Railroad Bridge Piers	August 8, 1989 (#89001061)	Both sides of Bull Run just east of Manassas Park; 38°46′35″N 77°25′17″W	Manassas Park	Extends into Prince William County
48	Pohick Church	Pohick Church	October 16, 1969 (#69000239)	9201 U.S. Route 1; 38°42′33″N 77°11′38″W	Lorton	
49	Pope-Leighey House	Pope-Leighey House	December 18, 1970 (#70000791)	East of Accotink off U.S. Route 1; 38°43′10″N 77°08′10″W	Accotink	
50	Potomac Canal Historic District	Potomac Canal Historic District	October 18, 1979 (#79003038)	East of Great Falls; 38°59′44″N 77°15′14″W	Great Falls	
51	William H. Randall Estates		February 23, 2026 (#100012742)	Shiver Drive, between Rollins Drive and Colgate Drive; Jube Court; and Rollins Drive, south side between Radcliffe Drive and Duke Drive; 38°45′50″N 77°03′59″W	Alexandria	
52	St. Mary's Church	St. Mary's Church	July 1, 1976 (#76002104)	5605 Vogue Rd. 38°48′10″N 77°19′36″W	Fairfax Station	
53	Salona	Salona	July 24, 1973 (#73002011)	1214 Buchanan St. 38°56′17″N 77°10′15″W	McLean	
54	Silverbrook Methodist Church	Silverbrook Methodist Church	January 16, 2004 (#03001438)	8616 Silverbrook Rd. 38°43′33″N 77°14′35″W	Lorton	
55	Southwest No. 6 Boundary Marker of the Original District of Columbia	Southwest No. 6 Boundary Marker of the Original District of Columbia	February 1, 1991 (#91000011)	S. Jefferson St. south of the junction with Columbia Pike, in the median strip 38°51′07″N 77°07′09″W	Bailey's Crossroads	
56	Southwest No. 7 Boundary Marker of the Original District of Columbia	Southwest No. 7 Boundary Marker of the Original District of Columbia	February 1, 1991 (#91000012)	Behind 3101 S. Manchester St. 38°51′45″N 77°07′58″W	Seven Corners	
57	Southwest No. 8 Boundary Marker of the Original District of Columbia	Southwest No. 8 Boundary Marker of the Original District of Columbia	February 1, 1991 (#91000013)	Junction of Wilson Boulevard and John Marshall Dr., behind an apartment building 38°52′21″N 77°08′45″W	Seven Corners	Extends into Arlington County
58	Spring Hill Farm	Spring Hill Farm	November 22, 2002 (#02000446)	1121 Spring Hill Rd. 38°56′53″N 77°13′32″W	McLean	
59	Sully	Sully	December 18, 1970 (#70000793)	North of the junction of U.S. Route 50 and State Route 28; 38°54′28″N 77°25′51″W	Chantilly	
60	Sydenstricker School	Sydenstricker School	August 22, 2012 (#12000539)	8511 Hooes Rd. 38°45′21″N 77°14′21″W	Springfield	
61	Taft Archeological Site#029-5411	Taft Archeological Site#029-5411	August 11, 2004 (#04000859)	Address Restricted; 38°38′55″N 77°11′40″W	Lorton	
62	Tauxemont Historic District	Tauxemont Historic District	February 9, 2006 (#06000033)	Between Fort Hunt Rd. and Accotink Place, including Shenandoah, Tauxemont, Namassin, Westmoreland and Gahant Rds., and Bolling; 38°44′42″N 77°03′20″W	Alexandria	
63	Tower House	Tower House	May 2, 2006 (#06000341)	9066 Tower House Place; 38°42′41″N 77°04′01″W	Alexandria	
64	U.S. Geological Survey National Center	U.S. Geological Survey National Center	August 10, 2020 (#100005414)	12201 Sunrise Valley Dr. 38°56′59″N 77°22′04″W	Reston	
65	Vale School-Community House	Vale School-Community House	June 8, 2011 (#11000349)	3124 Fox Mill Rd. 38°53′30″N 77°20′56″W	Oakton	
66	George Washington's Gristmill	George Washington's Gristmill	August 8, 2003 (#03000739)	5512 George Washington Memorial Parkway; 38°42′47″N 77°07′48″W	Lorton	
67	West Cornerstone	West Cornerstone	February 1, 1991 (#91000014)	West side of Meridian St., south of the junction with Williamsburg Boulevard; 38°53′36″N 77°10′20″W	Falls Church	
68	Woodlawn Plantation	Woodlawn Plantation	February 26, 1970 (#70000792)	West of the junction of U.S. Route 1 and State Route 235; also 9000 U.S. Route 1; 38°43′03″N 77°08′14″W	Alexandria	9000 Richmond represents a boundary increase of November 18, 2011
69	Woodlawn Quaker Meetinghouse	Woodlawn Quaker Meetinghouse	May 21, 2009 (#09000335)	8990 Woodlawn Rd. 38°42′51″N 77°08′32″W	Fort Belvoir	

== Former listing ==
	Name on the Register	Image	Date listed	Date removed	Location	City or town	Description
1	Moorefield	Moorefield	April 19, 1978 (#78003014)	June 10, 2005	Moorefield Hill Place	Vienna	Dismantled in February 2003

== See also ==
- List of National Historic Landmarks in Virginia
- National Register of Historic Places listings in Virginia
- National Register of Historic Places listings in Alexandria, Virginia
- National Register of Historic Places listings in Fairfax, Virginia
- National Register of Historic Places listings in Falls Church, Virginia
