= Spring Hill Farm (McLean, Virginia) =

Historic house in Virginia, United States

- U.S. National Register of Historic Places
- Virginia Landmarks Register
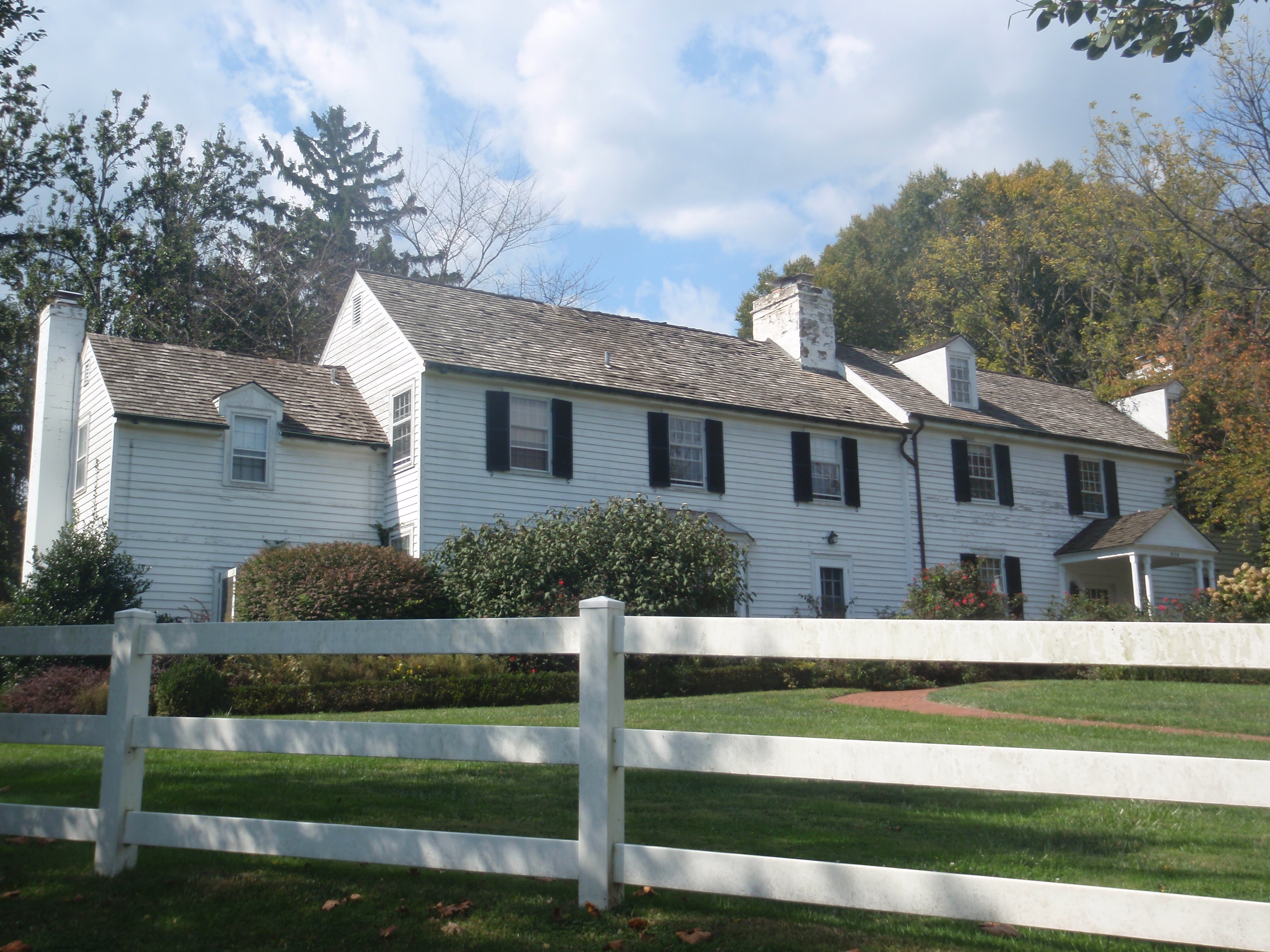
- Spring Hill Farm, September 2012

- Location within Northern Virginia Location within Virginia Location within the United States
- Location: 1121 Spring Hill Rd., McLean, Virginia
- Coordinates: 38°56′52.644″N 77°13′31.81″W
- Area: 0 acres (0 ha)
- Built: c. 1822, 1850
- Architectural style: Federal, Mid 19th Century Revival
- NRHP reference No.: 02000446
- VLR No.: 029-0035

Significant dates
- Added to NRHP: November 22, 2002
- Designated VLR: December 5, 2001

Spring Hill Farm is a historic home located at Great Falls, Fairfax County, Virginia. It was built about 1822, and is a 2 1/2-story, frame farmhouse dwelling in the Federal style. A two-story rear wing was added in 1850. A 19th century south wing was replaced in 1972. Also on the property are two contributing barns, one apparently built before the American Civil War and one built in 1890.

It was listed on the National Register of Historic Places in 2002. It has since been demolished as of February 2014.
