= Jeremiah Moore =

Jeremiah Moore may refer to:

- Jeremiah Moore (minister) (1746–1815), American Baptist minister
- Jeremiah Moore (politician), American politician from Arkansas
