= Bois Doré =

Bois Doré may refer to:

- Bois Doré (McLean, Virginia), a historic house
- Bois Doré (Newport, Rhode Island), a historic chateau-style mansion
- Les Beaux Messieurs de Bois-Doré, an 1857 French historical novel by George Sand
  - The Gallant Lords of Bois-Doré, a 1976 French television serial based on the novel
