= William Gunnell House (Great Falls, Virginia) =

Historic house in Virginia, United States

- U.S. National Register of Historic Places
- Virginia Landmarks Register
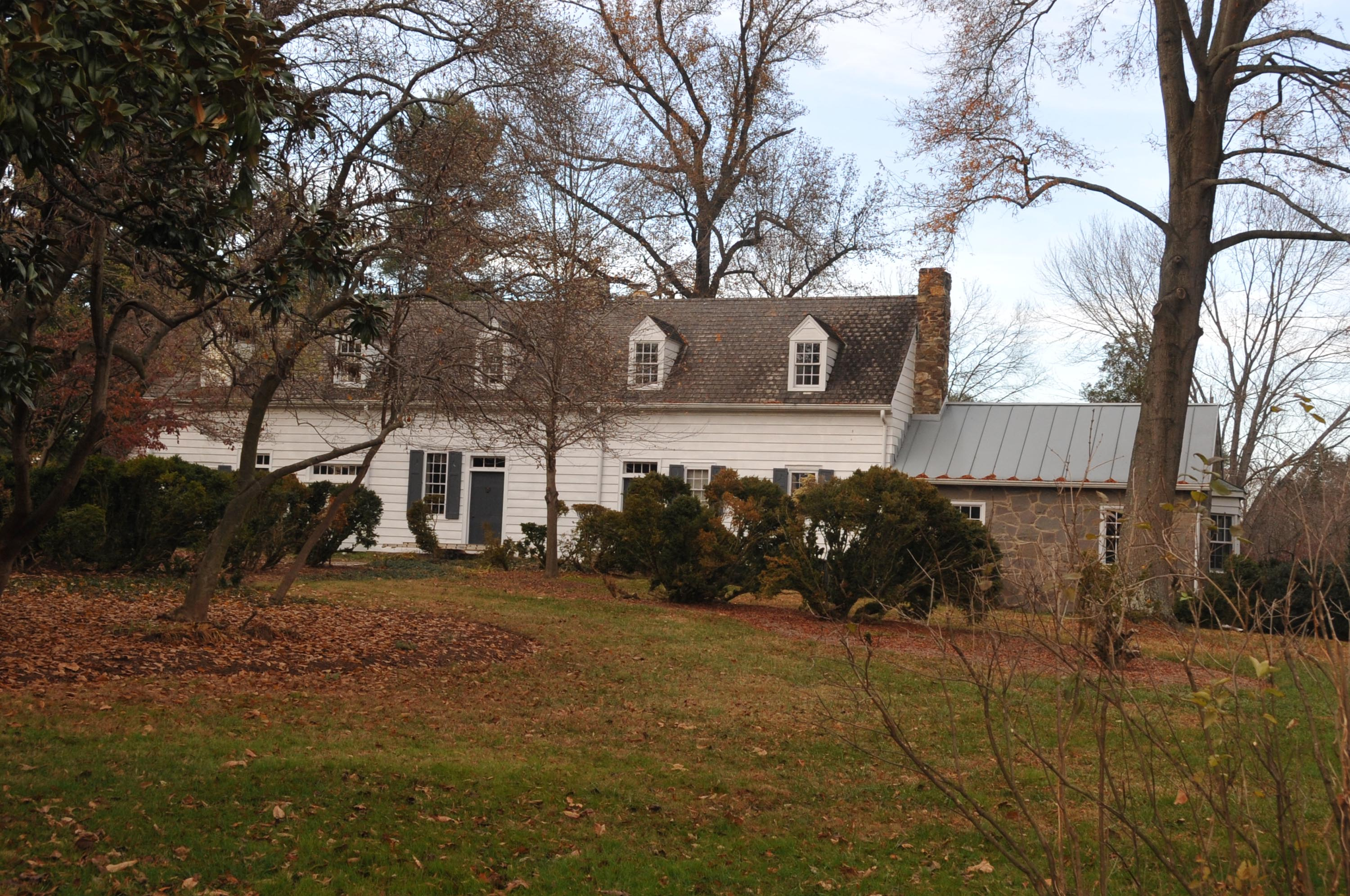
- William Gunnell House, November 2012

- Location within Northern Virginia Location within Virginia Location within the United States
- Location: 600 Insbruck Ave., near Great Falls, Virginia
- Coordinates: 39°0′14″N 77°17′06″W
- Area: 10 acres (4.0 ha)
- Built: c. 1750
- Architectural style: Colonial, Colonial Revival
- NRHP reference No.: 03000447
- VLR No.: 029-0109

Significant dates
- Added to NRHP: May 22, 2003
- Designated VLR: December 4, 2002

William Gunnell House, also known as Gunnell's Run, is a historic home located in Great Falls, Fairfax County, Virginia. It consists of a frame dwelling built in two stages and dated to about 1750, together with its compatible and unobtrusive 20th-century additions. The earliest section is a 1 1/2-story frame Colonial-era dwelling with irregular bays and three entrances. It was carefully restored and rehabilitated in the preservation manner of the Colonial Revival style after 1933. Also on the property are a contributing log house (c. 1770) outbuilding and two early wells.

It was listed on the National Register of Historic Places in 2003.
