= Hickory Hill (McLean, Virginia) =

Historic house in Virginia, United States

- U.S. Historic district – Contributing property
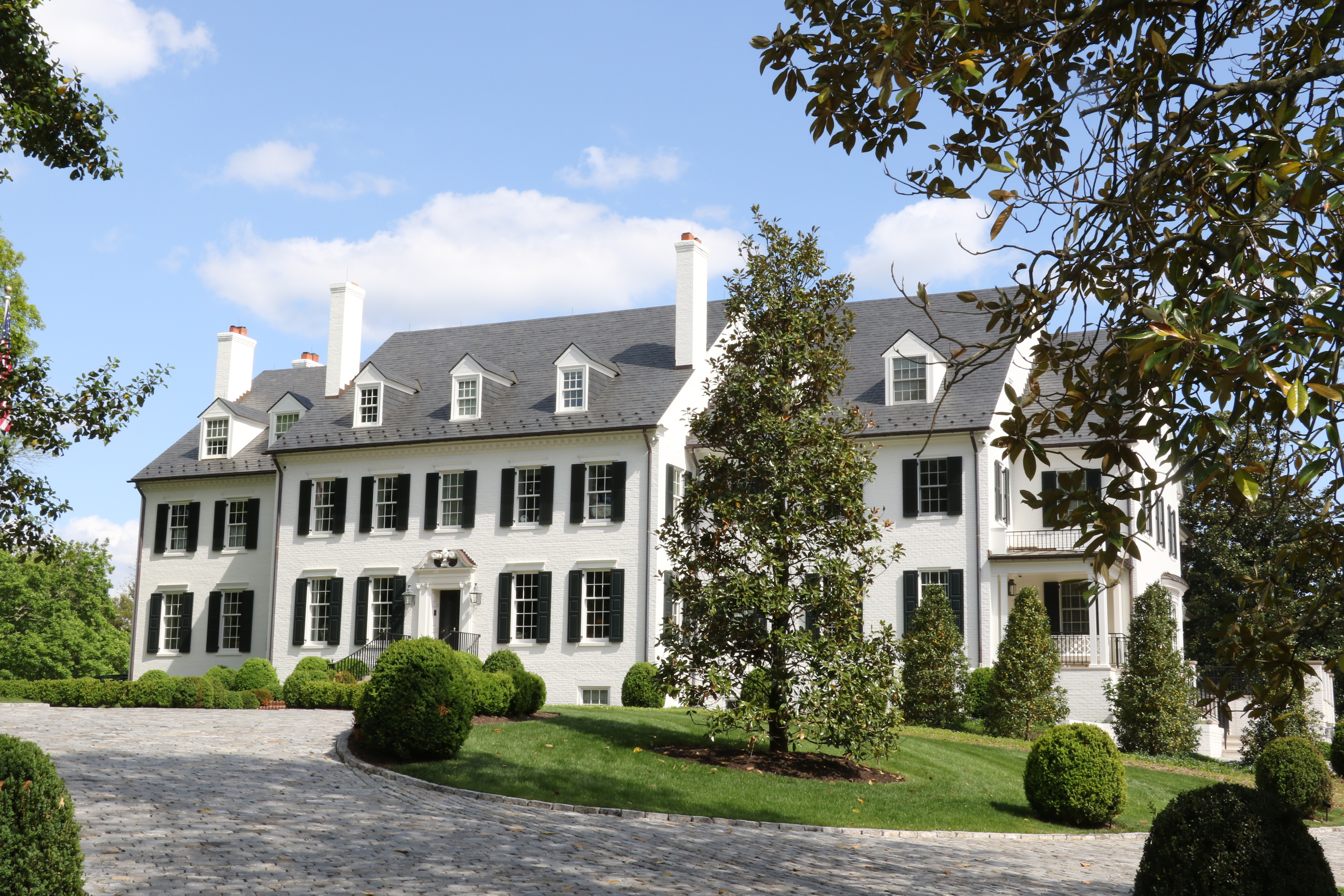
- Hickory Hill in 2015

- Location within Virginia
- Location: 1147 Chain Bridge Road; McLean, Virginia, U.S.
- Coordinates: 38°56′40″N 77°09′42″W
- Part of: Langley Fork Historic District (ID82001818)
- Designated CP: October 19, 1982

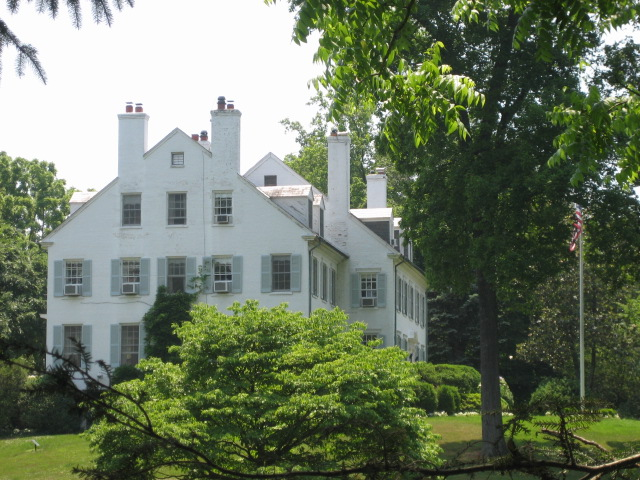
Side view of Hickory Hill in 2007

Hickory Hill is a large brick house in McLean, Virginia, United States. It was owned from 1955 to 2009 by members of the Kennedy family, an American political family that has long been prominent in American politics, public service, entertainment and business. The house is a contributing property to the Langley Fork Historic District.

== History and ownership ==
Although the date when the house was constructed cannot be determined precisely, architectural historians, noting that an 1865 ordnance map of the area does not indicate the house, date it to shortly after the American Civil War, circa 1870.

The 5.6-acre (2.3 ha) property was part of an 88-acre (36 ha) tract acquired in 1846 by George Walter, who built several houses in the area prior to his death in 1890. The core of the house itself originally featured an encircling verandah, topped by a mansard roof. In 1931, the house was extensively remodeled largely to its current configuration. It was expanded again in 1964 with a north wing addition.

In 1920, James Patrick "Pat" Speer, a Washington D.C. dentist, lived at Hickory Hill, along with his wife Susan Virginia "Jenny" Morgan Speer. At that time, they lived in the house with their five younger children, as their eldest daughter had already married and moved away. Pat Speer practiced dentistry in Washington D.C., in the same building where Clara Barton had previously conducted her work with U.S. Civil War veterans and their families.

In July 1941, Hickory Hill became the home of newly appointed United States Supreme Court Associate Justice Robert H. Jackson and his wife, Irene, who, in 1955, after his death, sold Hickory Hill to United States Senator John F. Kennedy (D−Massachusetts) and his wife, Jacqueline.

John and Jacqueline Kennedy lived in the home for a year, during which time he authored (with Ted Sorensen) his Pulitzer Prize winning book Profiles in Courage.

After the 1956 Democratic National Convention, the house was sold to John's brother Robert F. Kennedy and his wife, Ethel, who had a growing family (eventually eleven children). While he lived at Hickory Hill, Robert Kennedy became Attorney General of the United States in 1961; a United States senator in 1965; and a presidential candidate in 1968.

Hickory Hill was placed on the market in 2004 by the Kennedy family at an asking price of $25 million and then subsequently withdrawn in November 2008. After it was sold in December 2009 to a Virginia businessman for $8.25 million, the house underwent a major renovation, completed in the fall of 2013.

== Historic district ==
The house, along with eleven other historic structures, was designated as a contributing property to the Langley Fork Historic District by the National Park Service's National Register of Historic Places on October 19, 1982.

== See also ==
- List of residences of presidents of the United States
