= Four Stairs =

Historic house in Virginia, United States

- U.S. National Register of Historic Places
- Virginia Landmarks Register
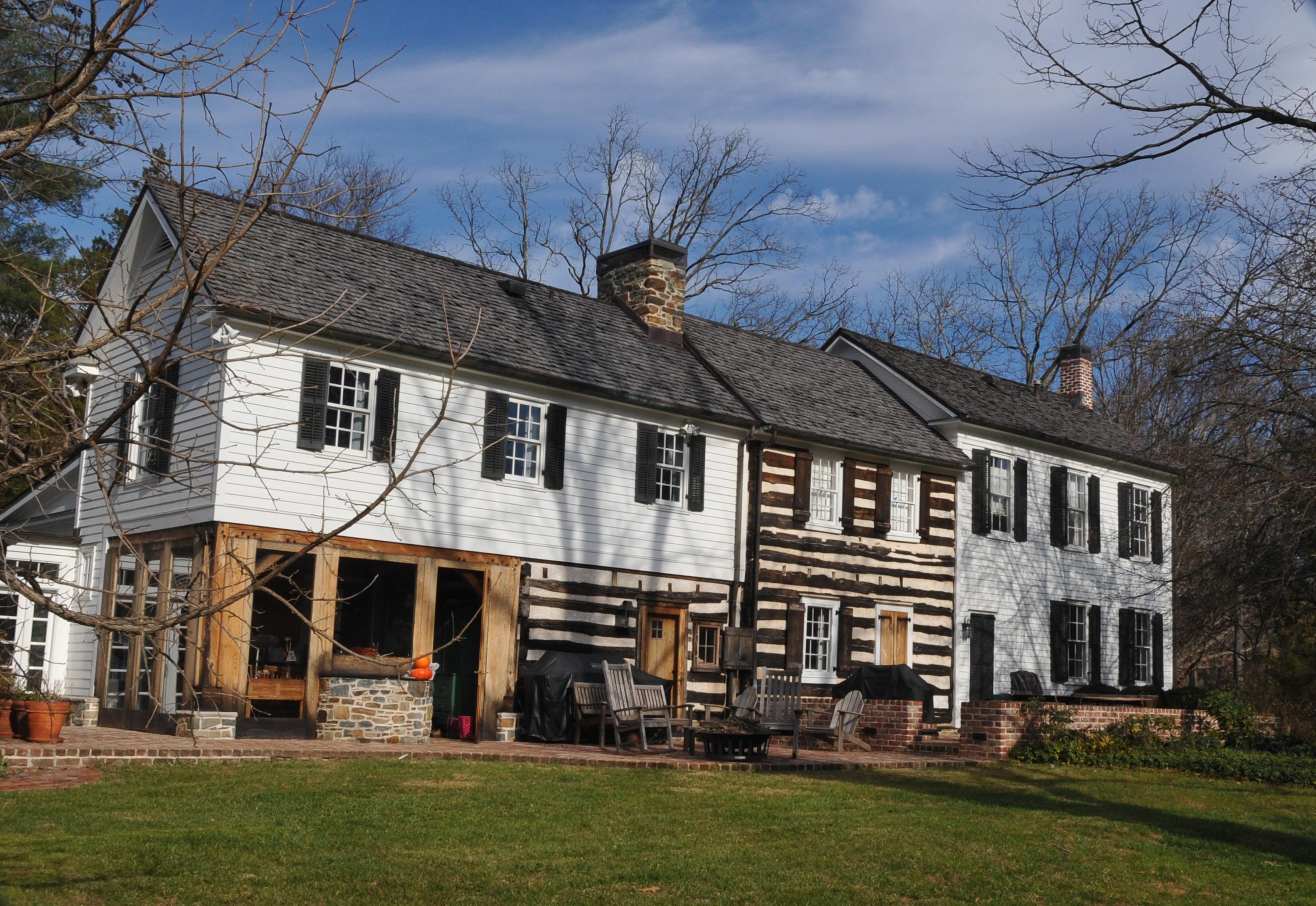
- Four Stairs, November 2012

- Location within Northern Virginia Location within Virginia Location within the United States
- Location: 830 Leigh Mill Rd., Great Falls, Virginia
- Coordinates: 38°59′10″N 77°16′35″W
- Area: 6.4 acres (2.6 ha)
- Built: c. 1737, c. 1850
- Architectural style: Greek Revival
- NRHP reference No.: 04000842
- VLR No.: 029-0106

Significant dates
- Added to NRHP: August 11, 2004
- Designated VLR: June 16, 2004

Four Stairs is a historic home located at Great Falls, Fairfax County, Virginia. The earliest section was built about 1737, as a gable-roofed, one-room, one-story with loft log house. It was later enlarged with a shed-roofed west side log pen and rear shed-roofed timber-framed kitchen. These early sections were raised to two-stories after 1796. A two-story, three-bay, parlor-and-side-hall-plan frame addition in the Greek Revival style was built about 1850, and became the focus of the house. The house was restored in 2002–2004. Also on the property are a contributing a family cemetery and a stone-lined hand-dug well.

It was listed on the National Register of Historic Places in 2004.
