= John Gunnell House =

Historic house in Virginia, United States

- U.S. National Register of Historic Places
- Virginia Landmarks Register
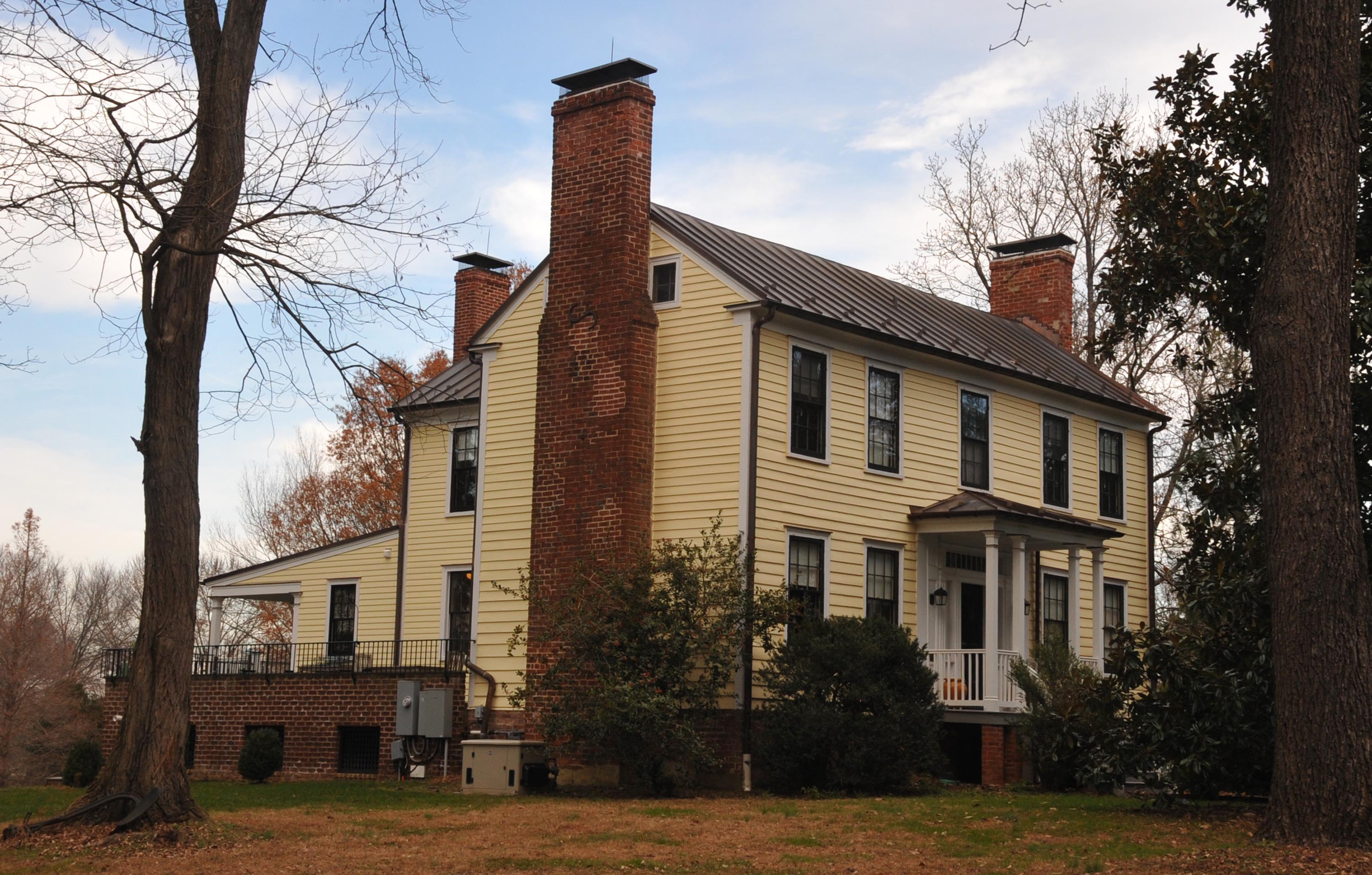
- John Gunnell House, November 2012

- Location within Northern Virginia Location within Virginia Location within the United States
- Location: 489 Arnon Meadow Rd., near Great Falls, Virginia
- Coordinates: 39°0′55″N 77°17′23″W
- Area: 5 acres (2.0 ha)
- Built: 1852
- Built by: Gunnell, John
- Architectural style: Greek Revival
- NRHP reference No.: 06001100
- VLR No.: 029-5525

Significant dates
- Added to NRHP: November 27, 2006
- Designated VLR: September 6, 2006

John Gunnell House, also known as the George Coleman House, is a historic home near Great Falls, Fairfax County, Virginia. It was built in 1852, and is a two-story, five-bay, T-shaped frame dwelling in a vernacular Greek Revival style. It has an English basement, attic, and intersecting gable roofs with brick chimneys at each of the three gable ends. Also on the property is a contributing outbuilding, now used as a tool shed.

It was listed on the National Register of Historic Places in 2006.
