= Clemyjontri Park =

Park in McLean, Virginia, US

- Interactive map of Clemyjontri Park
- Motto: Where Every Child Can Play
- Location: McLean, Fairfax County, Virginia, U.S.
- Coordinates: 38°56′41″N 77°09′24″W
- Area: 2 acres (0.81 ha)
- Created: 2006
- Operator: Fairfax County Park Authority
- Status: Open all year
- Website: Official site

Clemyjontri Park is a 2-acre park in McLean, Virginia, opened in 2006, and offers a setting for children of all abilities to congregate. It is located in the McLean area of Fairfax County, Virginia, at 6317 Georgetown Pike. It includes a carousel, four different playground areas around the carousel, and walking trails. Additional parking is available at Langley Fork Park across Georgetown Pike.

The land was donated by Adele Lebowitz in 1997, of Morton’s Department Store and namesake of the "Adele Lebowitz Center for Youth and Family" at the Washington School of Psychiatry, to the Fairfax County Park Authority to build the park.

The name Clemyjontri is derived from the donor’s four children: Carolyn (CL), Emily (EMY), John (Jon), and Petrina (Tri).

The park has been written about in the fictional book Murder Has a Sweet Tooth.
