= Cornwell Farm =

Historic house in Virginia, United States

- U.S. National Register of Historic Places
- Virginia Landmarks Register
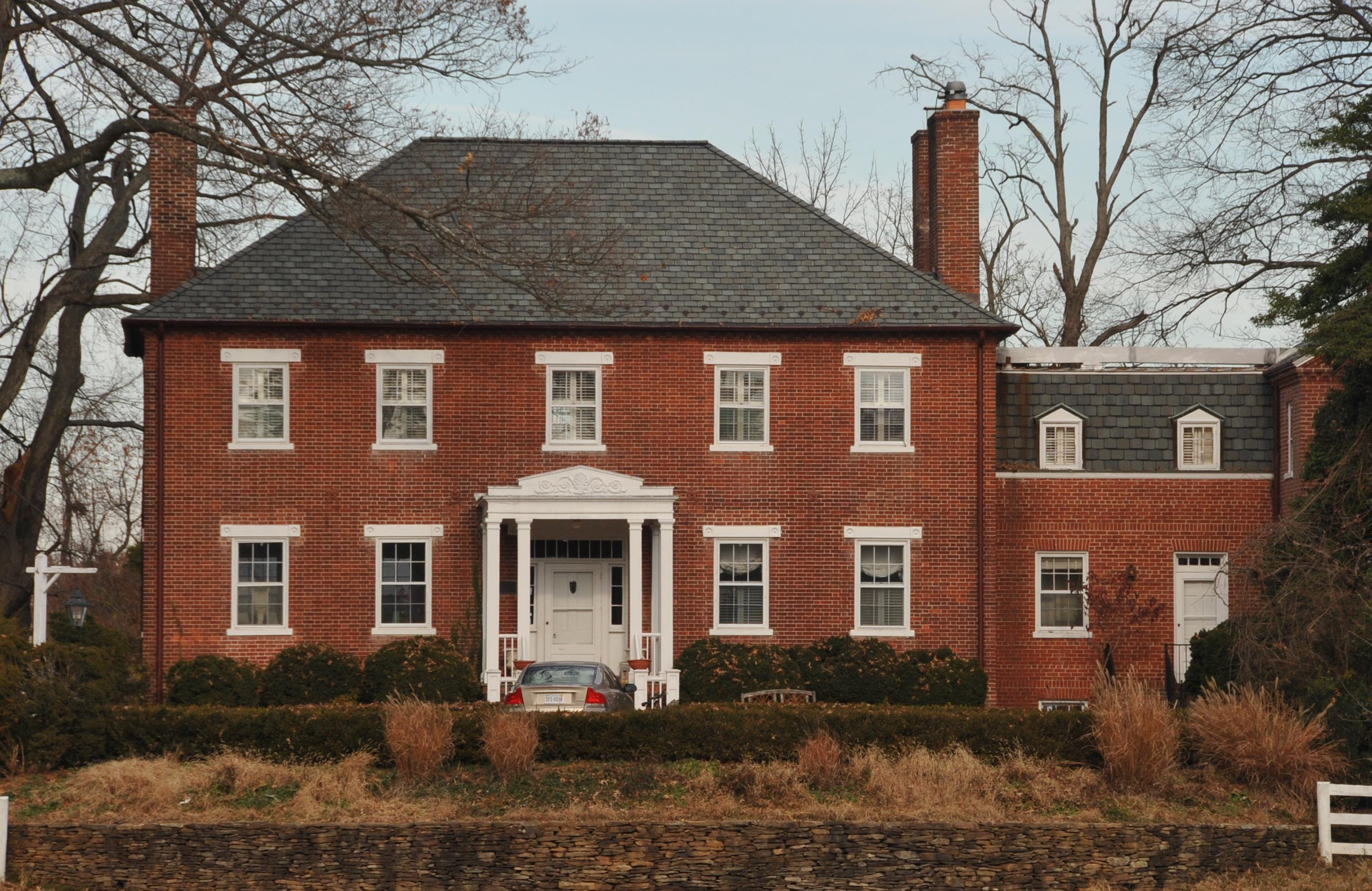
- Cornwell Farm, November 2012

- Location within Northern Virginia Location within Virginia Location within the United States
- Location: Southeast of Great Falls, 9414 Georgetown Pike, near Great Falls, Virginia
- Coordinates: 38°59′29″N 77°16′18″W
- Area: 8.6 acres (3.5 ha)
- Built: 1831
- Architectural style: Georgian
- NRHP reference No.: 77001488
- VLR No.: 029-0009

Significant dates
- Added to NRHP: April 13, 1977
- Designated VLR: September 21, 1976

Cornwell Farm is a historic home located in Great Falls, Fairfax County, Virginia. It was built in 1831, and is a two-story, five-bay brick dwelling with a hipped roof in the Georgian style. It has a 1 1/2-story addition connected by a gambrel roofed hyphen built in 1936–1937.

The house was constructed by John Jackson for his daughter, Julia Jackson Davis, when the farm was called Mine Ridge. After a period when it was named Fairview, it was eventually known as Cornwell Farm after owner B.F. Cornwell. Following a period of abandonment, it was restored by Robert Thompson Pell from 1936, who expanded the house. Additions were designed by architect Theodore W. Dominick.

The house was later owned by Louisiana congressman Jerry Huckaby and his wife Suzanna. The property is the subject of an effort to purchase and preserve it, to avoid possible demolition and construction of a six-house subdivision. Cornwell Farm was listed on the National Register of Historic Places in 1977.
