= Moorefield (Vienna, Virginia) =

Former historic house in Virginia, United States

- Formerly listed on the U.S. National Register of Historic Places
- Virginia Landmarks Register
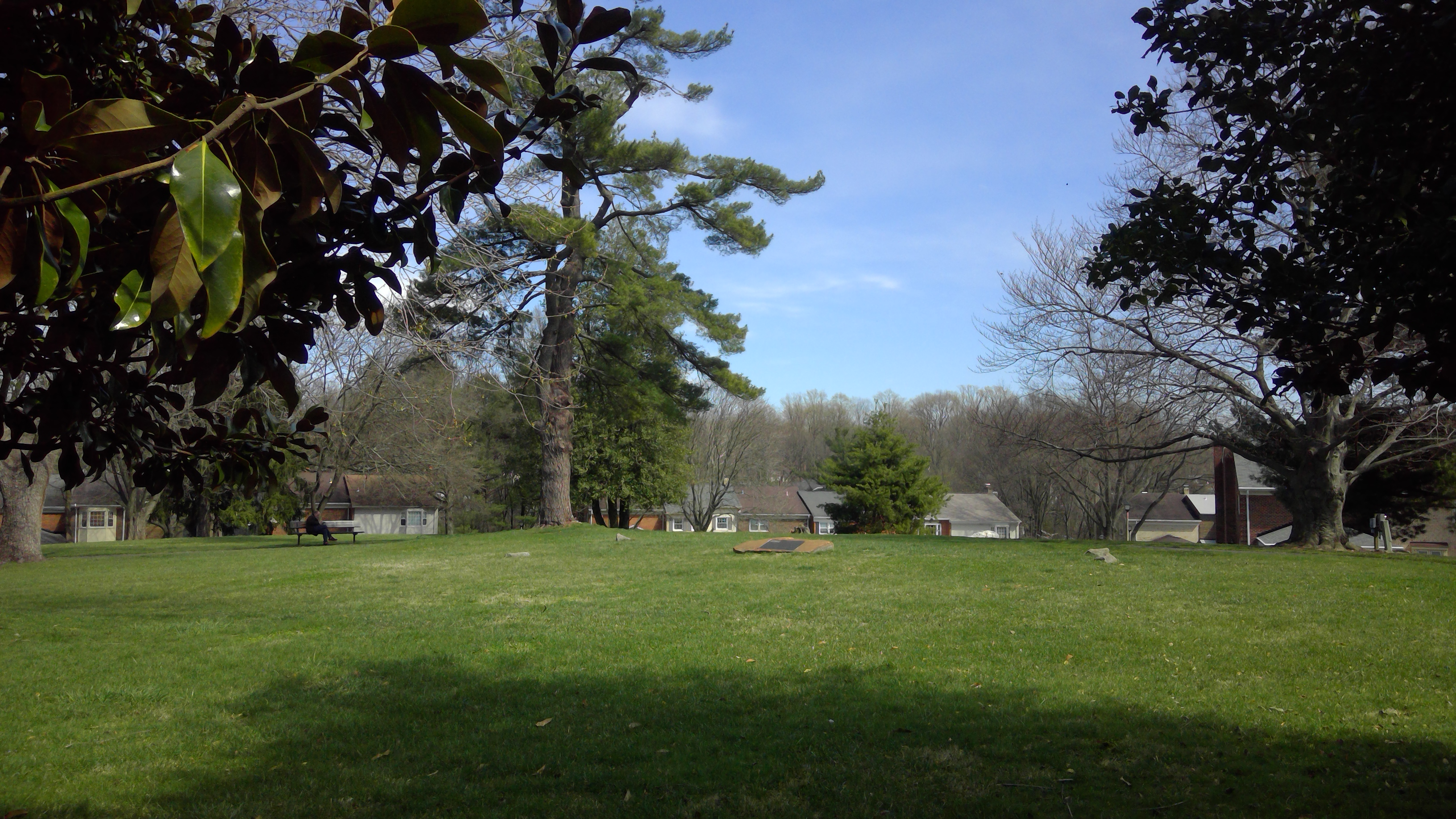
- Present site of Moorefield with marker and corner stones, circa 2017
- Location: Vienna, Virginia
- Built: 1794
- NRHP reference No.: 78003014
- VLR No.: 153-0004

Significant dates
- Added to NRHP: April 19, 1978
- Designated: April 19, 1978
- Designated VLR: September 20, 1977
- Removed from NRHP: June 10, 2005
- Delisted VLR: June 19, 2008

Moorefield in Fairfax County was the home of Reverend Jeremiah Moore (1746–1815), a Baptist preacher who was an early advocate of religious freedom and the separation of church and state in Virginia. Moorefield was previously on the Virginia Landmarks Register and the U.S. National Register of Historic Places before the building was dismantled in 2003.

== History ==
The one and a half story home was originally a simple wood-frame farmhouse, built in around 1794 on Moore's 600-acre estate. Beginning in the 1970s, the home was owned by the Town of Vienna, Virginia. On April 19, 1978, the home was placed on the National Register of Historic Places, with plans for renovation and development of the home as a cultural site.

The building eventually was in a state of disrepair and was deemed too expensive to restore. In September 2003, the building was dismantled and its parts were put into storage. The property was delisted from the registry in 2005.

== See also ==
- List of National Historic Landmarks in Virginia
- National Register of Historic Places listings in Fairfax County, Virginia
