= Geebo =

- Company type: Private company
- Website type: classifieds
- Available in: English
- Founded: 2000
- Headquarters: McLean, Virginia, United States
- Founder: Greg Collier
- Website: geebo.com
- Launched: 2000
- Current status: active

Geebo is an American online classifieds marketplace website based in McLean, Virginia. It was founded in 2000 by entrepreneur Greg Collier as a site for promoting job listings and other services in the Sacramento, California region.

== Overview ==
Geebo is an independent online classified advertising site populated through partnerships with speciality advertising sites, and free listings posted by private individuals. Primary categories for the listings include: employment, real estate, automotive and general merchandise.

The site has evolved as one of a number of classifieds sites on the Internet looking to reinvent a business that was largely neglected by the newspaper industry as Internet services began to displace traditional print outlets.

Geebo founder Greg Collier has become an outspoken advocate for safety in the online marketplace and, in 2010, altered the company's business model to exclude personals ads. The site reviews all submitted ads for signs of fraud, deception or otherwise improper behavior before allowing them to be published and has called on all operators of online classifieds to do the same.

== Online safety campaign ==
In 2010, on the heels of headline news about prostitution and other criminal activity on other classified sites - notably competitor Craigslist - Geebo launched a campaign to raise awareness about the dangers within online classifieds and the steps that site operators should be taking to reduce the potential for innocent victims to be preyed upon.

In July 2010, Geebo joined the Coalition Against Trafficking in Women (CATW), Prostitution Research and Education and numerous other co-sponsors in a protest against Craigslist's facilitation of sex trafficking through unmonitored ads on that site.

In September 2010, Geebo removed the personals section from its site. The company noted that, while there were no reported incidents of criminal behavior resulting from Geebo's personals, there was a sense of moral responsibility around keeping the listings safe.

In early 2011, Geebo's Collier issued an open letter to his counterparts in the online classifieds business, asking them to take steps to keep their sites safe, including: screening ads before publishing, reporting suspicious activity to law enforcement and removing sections that feature adult-oriented ads.

In April 2011, Geebo partnered with WeGoLook, a startup that provides on-site inspection services for would-be buyers who utilize online classifieds.

In October 2012, Geebo reached a site traffic milestone, exceeding 1 million monthly unique visitors after a shift in site strategy to emphasize job listings on the site.

In January 2013, due to the number of puppy mills that sell sick or abused animals through online classifieds platforms, Geebo decided to stop accepting ads for pets.

In May 2015, Geebo partnered with the AIM Group's SafeTrade Station initiative in order to provide a list of safe trading spots at police stations across the country.

In 2016, in response to the Orlando nightclub shooting and other mass shootings, Geebo stopped accepting ads for firearms even though no firearms-related crimes were ever linked to Geebo.

In February 2019, Geebo announced that they were monitoring the responses to ads made through the Geebo platform in order to try to prevent users from being contacted by obvious scammers.
