= Silverbrook Methodist Church =

Historic church in Virginia, United States

- U.S. National Register of Historic Places
- Virginia Landmarks Register
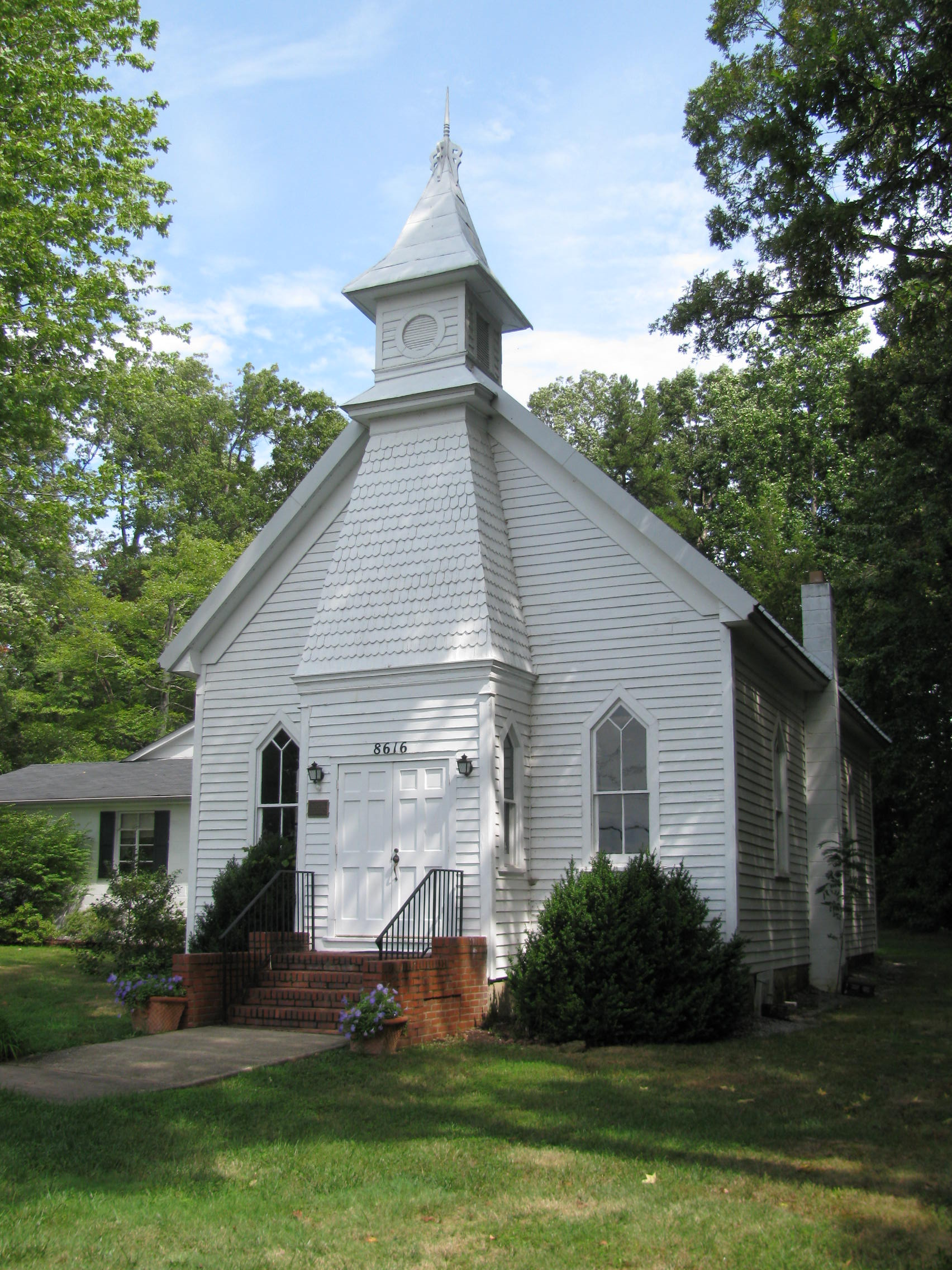
- Silverbrook Methodist Church, September 2012

- Location within Northern Virginia Location within Virginia Location within the United States
- Location: 8616 Silverbrook Rd., VA 600, Lorton, Virginia
- Coordinates: 38°43′32″N 77°14′35″W
- Area: 1.7 acres (0.69 ha)
- Built: 1908
- Architect: Grimsley, A.W.; Harrover, Robert L.
- Architectural style: Late Gothic Revival
- NRHP reference No.: 03001438
- VLR No.: 029-5018

Significant dates
- Added to NRHP: January 16, 2004
- Designated VLR: September 10, 2003

Silverbrook Methodist Church, also known as Silverbrook United Methodist Church, is a historic Methodist church located at Lorton, Fairfax County, Virginia. It was built between 1906 and 1908, and is a rectangular, one-story, one-room, gable-front, frame structure with a projecting front vestibule topped by a bell tower. It is in the Late Gothic Revival style and measures approximately 24 feet by 40 feet (7.3 by 12.2 meters). Also on the property is a contributing church cemetery dated to 1911.

It was listed on the National Register of Historic Places in 2004.
