= Langley Fork Historic District =

Historic district in Virginia, United States

- U.S. National Register of Historic Places
- U.S. Historic district
- Virginia Landmarks Register
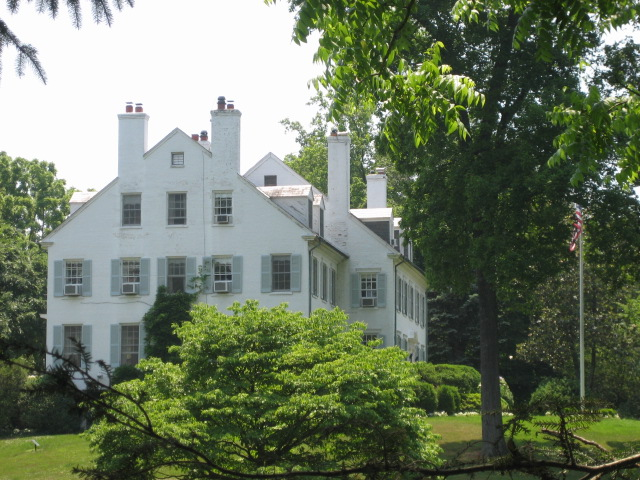
- Hickory Hill, July 2007

- Location within Northern Virginia Location within Virginia Location within the United States
- Location: Jct. of Georgetown Pike and Old Chain Bridge Rd., Langley, Virginia
- Coordinates: 38°56′46″N 77°09′36″W
- Area: 37 acres (15 ha)
- NRHP reference No.: 82001818
- VLR No.: 029-0214

Significant dates
- Added to NRHP: October 19, 1982
- Designated VLR: September 16, 1980

Langley Fork Historic District is a national historic district located at Langley, Fairfax County, Virginia. It encompasses 12 contributing buildings. They include Hickory Hill (c. 1870, 1931, 1964), the Langley Ordinary (c. 1850), the Langley Toll House (1820), Gunnell's Chapel, the Langley Friends meeting house (1853), a day school in an old church formerly converted to a residence (the Mackall House, 1858), and an Amoco service station dated to 1932.

It was listed on the National Register of Historic Places in 1982.
