= Bois Doré (McLean, Virginia) =

Historic house in McLean, Virginia, US

- U.S. National Register of Historic Places
- Virginia Landmarks Register
- Location within Northern Virginia Location within Virginia Location within the United States
- Location: 15008 Georgetown Pike, McLean, VA, 22102
- Coordinates: 38°57′40″N 77°13′20″W
- Built: 1951
- NRHP reference No.: 100005880
- VLR No.: 029-6641

Significant dates
- Added to NRHP: December 7, 2020
- Designated VLR: September 17, 2020

Bois Doré is a historic house located in McLean, Virginia, United States along Virginia State Route 193 (Georgetown Pike). It was built in 1951 and was added to the Virginia Landmarks Register and the National Register of Historic Places in 2020.

== History ==
=== Construction and latter renovations ===
Commissioned by Karen Gram Scott, a socialite from Washington, D.C., Bois Doré (French for golden wood) was designed by architectural historian and preservationist Thomas Tileston Waterman and William Max Haussmann, who would later serve as the chief architect at the National Park Service National Capital Region jurisdiction. Waterman was not a licensed architect and collaborated on the project with his colleague Haussmann to meet the requirements of Virginia state building codes.

Bois Doré was completed in 1951, and would be sold by Scott the next year to Chalmers and Barbara Wood. The couple divorced, and in 1967, it would be sold to Bryan Munroe and Charlotte Fredette Eagle, who would perform major renovations to the property, including the addition of a wine cellar in the basement, the conversion of the garage into a guest house, and the construction of a new six-car garage adjacent to the guest house, which would store antique vehicles before becoming a living space. Gardens designed by Ms. Eagle were added around the property, and a gazebo, a pavilion, and a tea house among other smaller structures were constructed at the home. The original exterior finishes and interior plaster walls, flooring, woodwork, and fireplaces as designed by Waterman and Haussmann remain intact.

=== Preservation ===
In 2006, the owners of Bois Doré signed conservation easements with the Northern Virginia Conservation trust to preserve the property from any future development. On September 17, 2020, the Virginia Department of Historic Resources added Bois Doré to the Virginia Landmarks Register. Later that year on December 7, the National Park Service added the property to the National Register of Historic Places.
