= Sydenstricker Schoolhouse =

Historic school building in Virginia, US

- U.S. National Register of Historic Places
- Virginia Landmarks Register
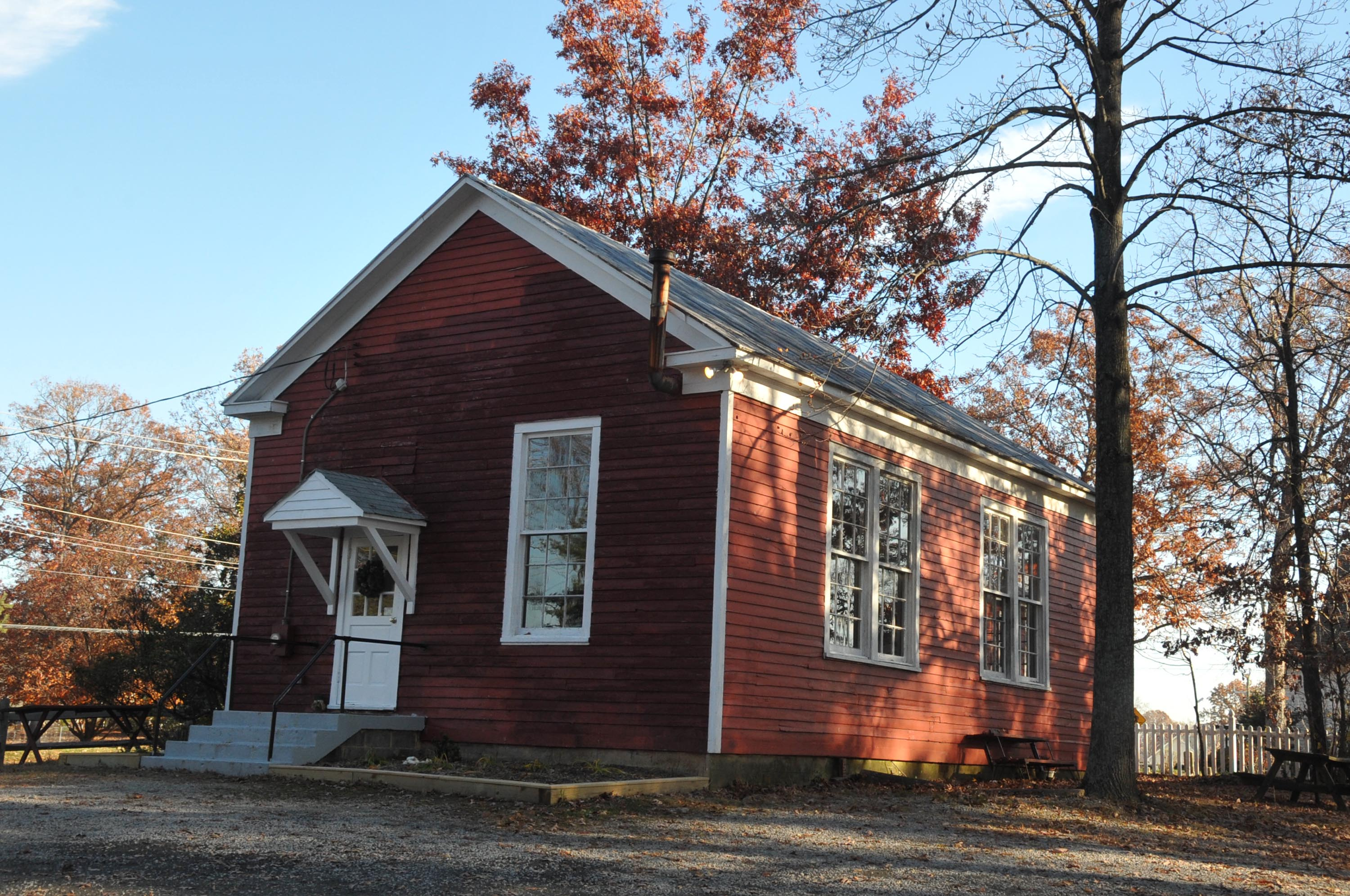
- Sydenstricker Schoolhouse in 2012

- Location within Virginia
- Location: 8511 Hooes Road, Springfield, Virginia
- Coordinates: 38°45′20″N 77°14′21″W
- Built: 1928
- Built by: Wooster, William Beauregard
- Architectural style: Vernacular
- Website: www.sydenstrickerschoolhouse.org/
- NRHP reference No.: 12000539
- VLR No.: 029-0154

Significant dates
- Added to NRHP: August 22, 2012
- Designated VLR: June 21, 2012

The Sydenstricker Schoolhouse is a one-room schoolhouse located in Springfield, Virginia. Built in 1928, it was the last one-room schoolhouse to be constructed in Fairfax County and was the last to be used by white children when it was closed in 1939. In the decades since, it has been used by the local community for various social and civic events.

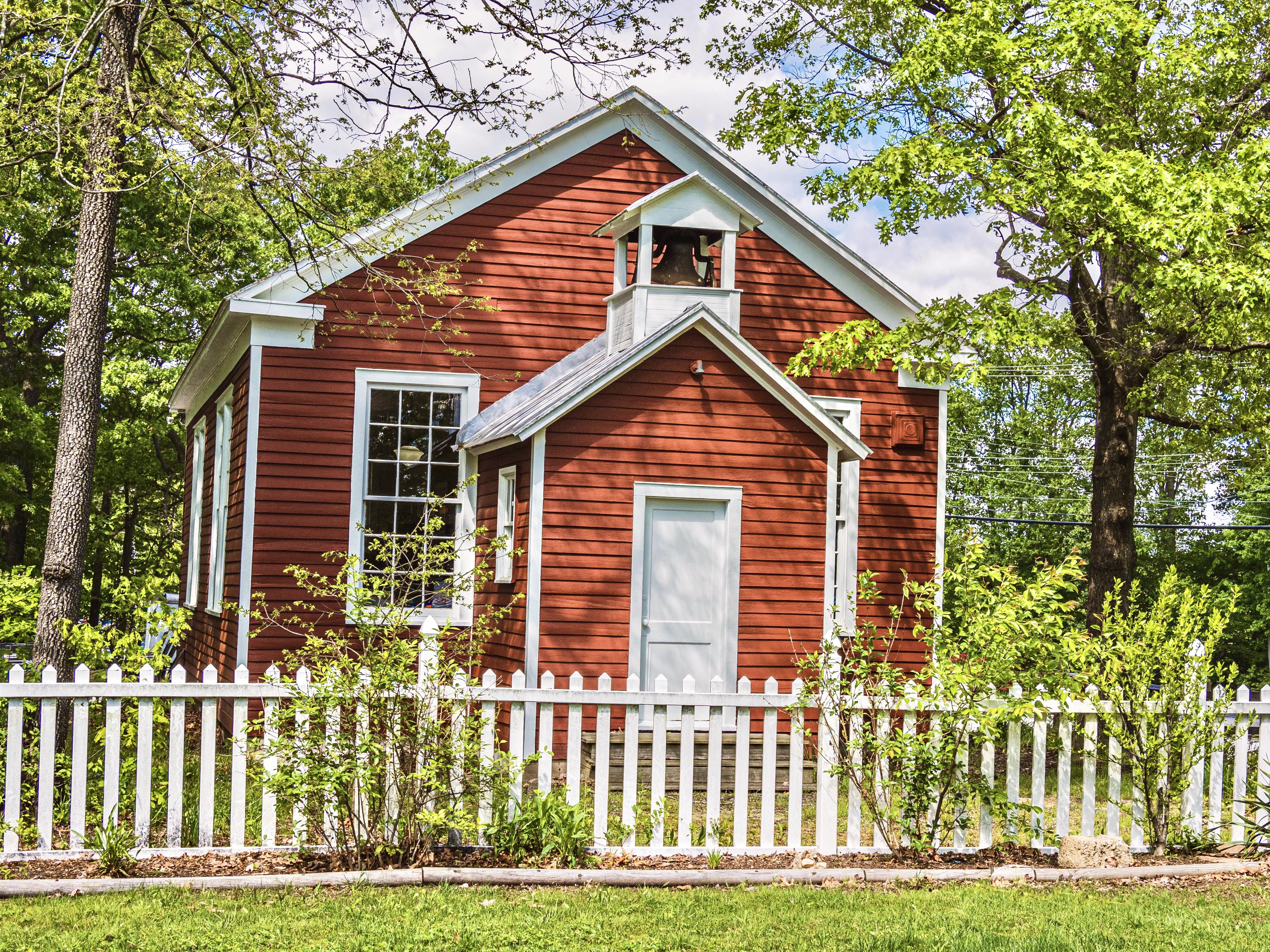

The schoolhouse was placed on the National Register of Historic Places in 2012. In 2017, it was commemorated with a historic marker by the Fairfax County Historical Commission.

== History ==
In July 1897, the Fairfax County school board decided to retire Pohick School #5, also known as the Barker School, which was built in 1874 and had become “dilapidated” and “deemed unfit to repair.”

That year, Barney Deavers deeded one acre of land for a new school, located about one mile west of the Barker School. The new school was officially called Pohick School #8 and would later be dubbed the Sydenstricker School, after the neighboring chapel and its founding minister, Christopher Sydenstricker.

At around this time, there were about 99 schoolhouses in Fairfax County serving 2,246 students. As late as 1906, all the schools in Fairfax County had just one or two rooms.

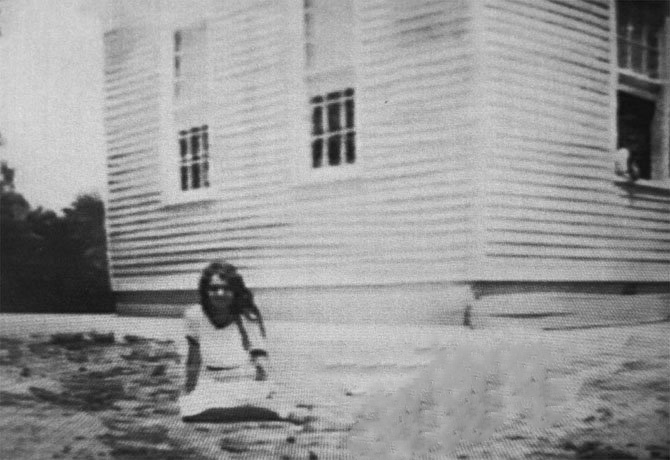
West facade of the Sydenstricker Schoolhouse soon after construction (circa 1929).

The original Pohick School #8 was destroyed by fire on July 12, 1928. Plans to replace the school were quickly made and the contract to build the current schoolhouse was awarded to William Beauregard Wooster in August 1928 who had the low bid of $1,649.75. In October, construction was completed and the school opened a month later. The school was the very last one-room schoolhouse built in Fairfax County.

In 1934, the school was closed and students were sent to a school in Burke, about 4 miles away. In general, improvements in roads and the availability of buses allowed schools to consolidate. In the ensuing years however, the community repeatedly petitioned to have the Sydenstricker School reopened. In September 1937, the school board agreed to reopen the school for students in the first four grades, as long as it could maintain attendance of at least 20 students. The school closed for good in June 1939, when the new, three-room, brick Burke School (still at the corner of Lee Chapel and Burke Lake Roads) was opened.

At that time, the Sydenstricker School was the last one-room schoolhouse used by white children in Fairfax County. One-room schoolhouses for black children continued to be used until the late 1940s.

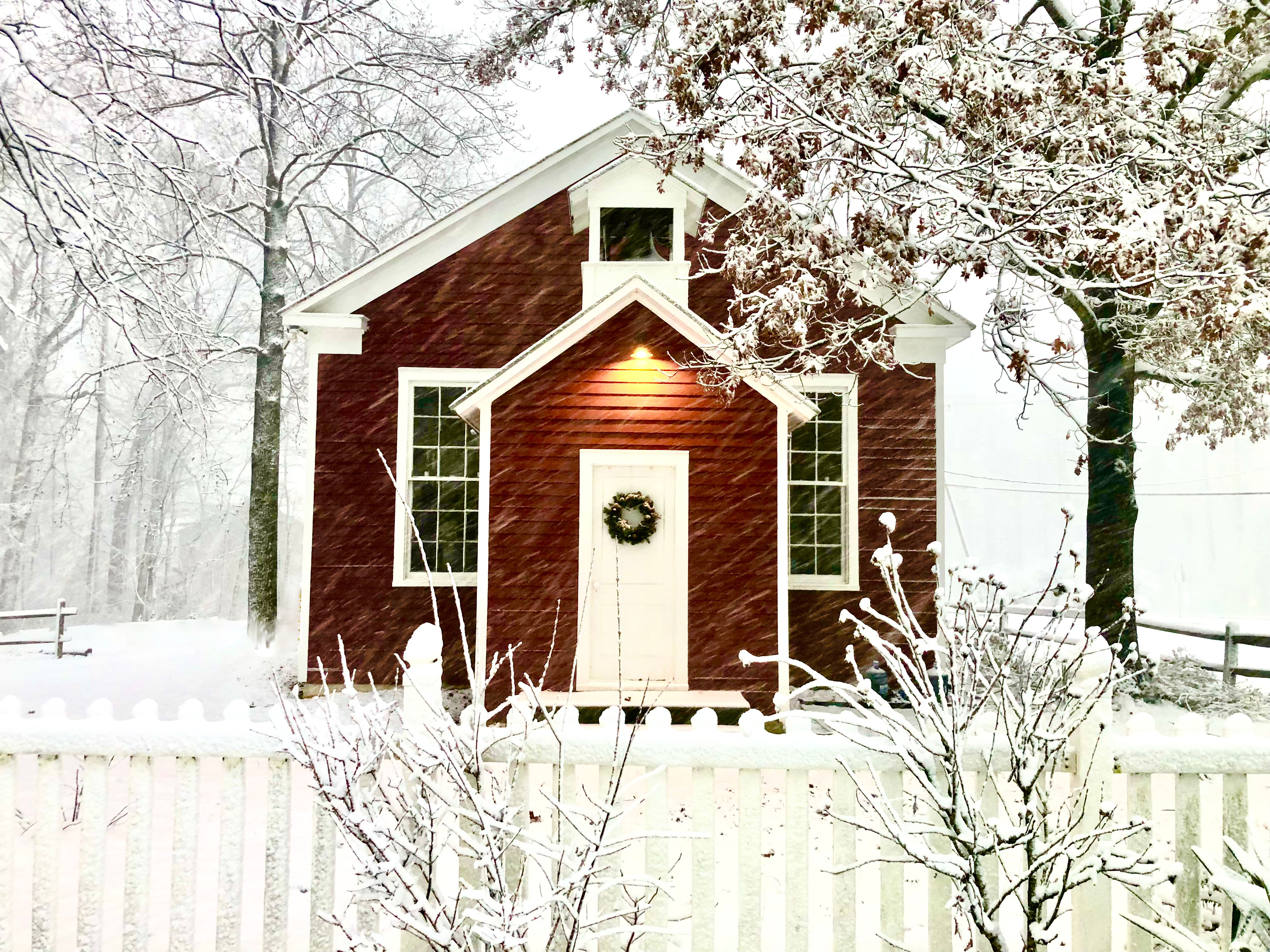

In the decades since, the Sydenstricker Schoolhouse has been used by the local community for myriad social and civic events. The Upper Pohick Community League (UPCL), organized in 1948, purchased the schoolhouse and property from the school board in 1954 for $550. A volunteer civic and social organization, initially serving an area of about 8 square miles, the UPCL was influential in the improvement of local roads, utilities, schools, and in shaping the development of the surrounding community. The schoolhouse is still owned by the UPCL. The Friends of Sydenstricker Schoolhouse was established in 2014 to preserve the schoolhouse and to maintain it for a variety of community uses.

== Building ==
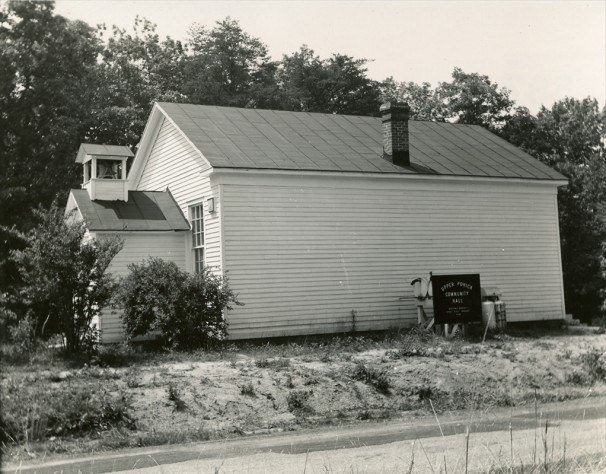
Windowless north facade of the Sydenstricker Schoolhouse circa 1957.

The Fairfax County Historic Commission has called the Sydenstricker Schoolhouse “the best preserved example of an early twentieth century one-room schoolhouse in Fairfax County in nearly original condition and still on its original site.” Others surviving schoolhouses have been turned into residences, have had significant additions and alterations, and/or have been moved from their original locations.

The building is a one-story, front-gabled structure that is about 850 square feet, plus a small cloakroom and belfry that was added to the entrance soon after the initial construction. A distinct feature is the window- and door-less north wall. The building retains much of its original wooden weatherboard siding and trim. The nine-over-nine double-hung-sash windows, foundation, framing and studs, and standing-seam metal tin roof are all original. Originally painted yellow or white, it has been painted red with white trim since the 1960s. A professional, historically-sensitive restoration of the exterior was performed in 2017-2018.

The interior walls are covered in the original beaded-board wainscoting, placed vertically to chair-rail height and then horizontally to the 12-foot ceiling. The quarter-sawn pine floors are original to the building. The belfry contains the school bell purchased in the 1920s for the original schoolhouse.

The largest changes made by the UPCL date from the 1950s, including the addition of a gravel parking lot, the conversion of a window into a new main entrance, the addition of electricity and heating systems, and the removal of the wood stove and chimney along the north wall.
