= "A" Fort and Battery Hill Redoubt-Camp Early =

- U.S. National Register of Historic Places
- Virginia Landmarks Register
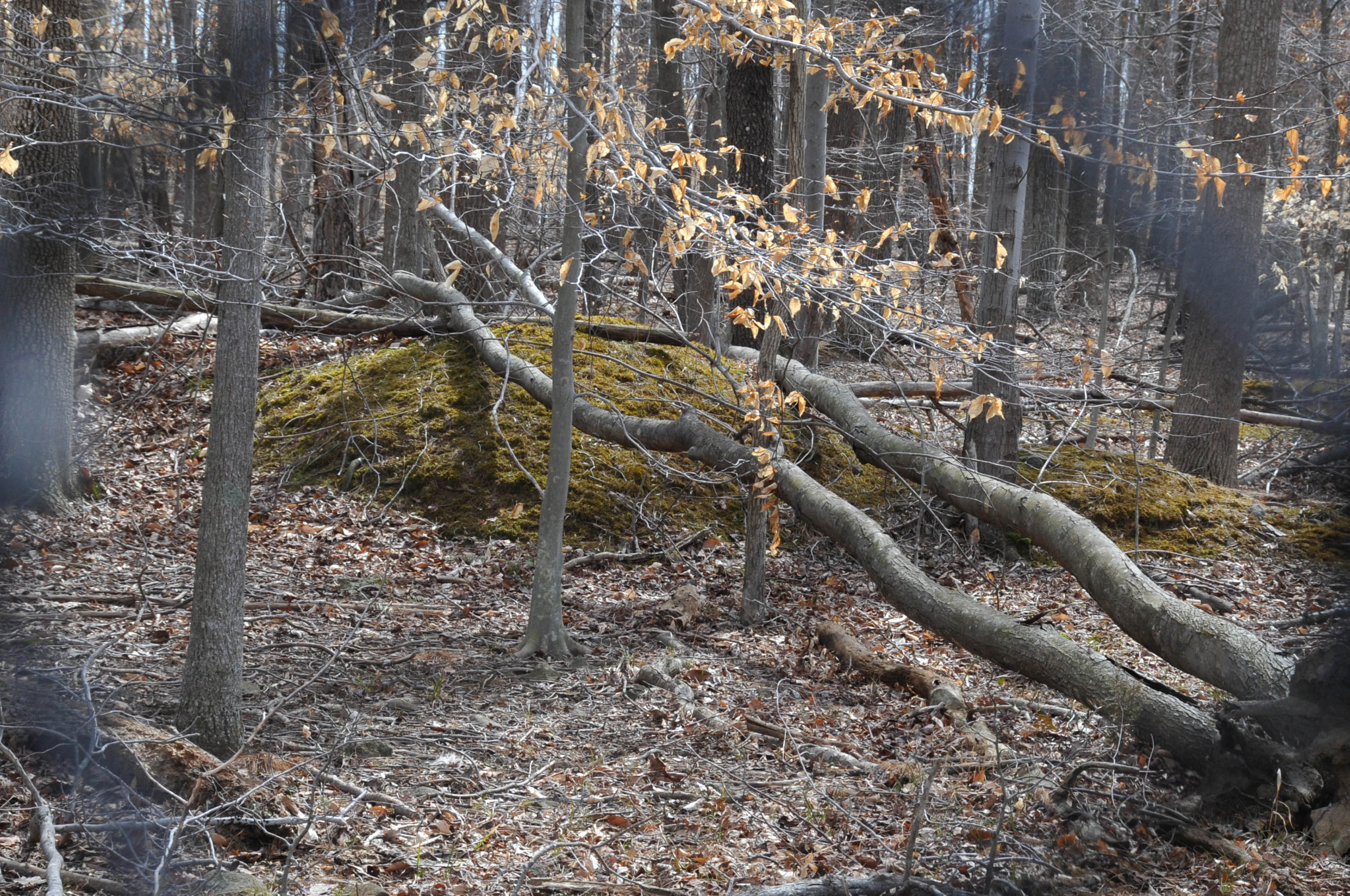
- Traces of Confederate redoubts and trenches are visible

- Location within Northern Virginia Location within Virginia Location within the United States
- Location: Balmoral Greens Ave., 1 mile (1.6 km) south of the junction with Compton Rd., Fairfax County, Virginia
- Coordinates: 38°47′22″N 77°25′40″W
- Area: 25 acres (10 ha)
- Built: 1862
- NRHP reference No.: 98001315
- VLR No.: 029-5006

Significant dates
- Added to NRHP: October 30, 1998
- Designated VLR: June 17, 1998

"A" Fort and Battery Hill Redoubt-Camp Early, also known as Measles Fort, is a historic American Civil War military facility and redoubt located in Fairfax County, Virginia south of Centreville and along Bull Run.

It was listed on the National Register of Historic Places in 1998.
