= Jeremiah Moore (minister) =

American Baptist minister (1746–1815)

Jeremiah Moore (June 7, 1746 – February 23, 1815) was an American Baptist minister who was an early advocate of religious freedom and the separation of church and state in Virginia.

== Biography ==
Jeremiah Moore was born on June 7, 1746, in Stafford County, Virginia. In November 1765, he married Lydia Reno. They had five sons and four daughters.

=== Religious leader ===
From a young age, Moore became a lay minister in the Episcopal Church, drawing an annual salary of 2,400 pounds of tobacco. While in his twenties, he was baptized and ordinated as a Baptist in 1772.

Because the Episcopal Church was the state-sanctioned religion in Colonial Virginia at the time, Moore was ostracized by many in the religious establishment. In 1773, he preached in Alexandria to challenge the restrictions on licensing ministers of other denominations. He was apprehended and jailed by authorities at least once, and continued to preach while briefly imprisoned.

I have felt the effects of the ecclesiastical establishment and have been told by the Judge from his seat 'you shall lay in jail until you rot' when my only crime was no other than that of preaching the Gospel of Jesus Christ....

— Jeremiah Moore, 1808

In 1773, Moore was one of the religious leaders who petitioned the Virginia General Assembly for the freedom to practice their religion without interference or persecution from civil authorities, which eventually led to the Virginia Statute for Religious Freedom. Moore's stance of religious liberty and separation of church and state brought him to the attention of various political leaders, including Thomas Jefferson, James Madison, and George Mason. Moore continued to work as a preacher in Virginia and was a guest preacher in New York, North Carolina, South Carolina, Georgia, Kentucky, and Tennessee.

In 1797, Moore attended the Katocton Baptist Association, which recommended the gradual emancipation of slaves. Moore was a founder of the First Baptist Church of Washington, First Baptist Church of Alexandria, and Second Baptist Church of Washington.

=== Military service ===
Moore served in the American Revolutionary War as a corporal in the Virginia Continental Line.

== Death and legacy ==
Moore died on February 23, 1815, aged 68. He is buried on the grounds of his home.

Moore's Moorefield home was listed in the National Register of Historical Places.

== Works ==
- An Enquiry Into the Nature and Propriety of Ecclesiastical Establishments (1808)
- The Jerusalem Which is Above (1808)
- The Doctrine of Universal Conditional Salvation Examined (1813)
