= Vale School-Community House =

- U.S. National Register of Historic Places
- Virginia Landmarks Register
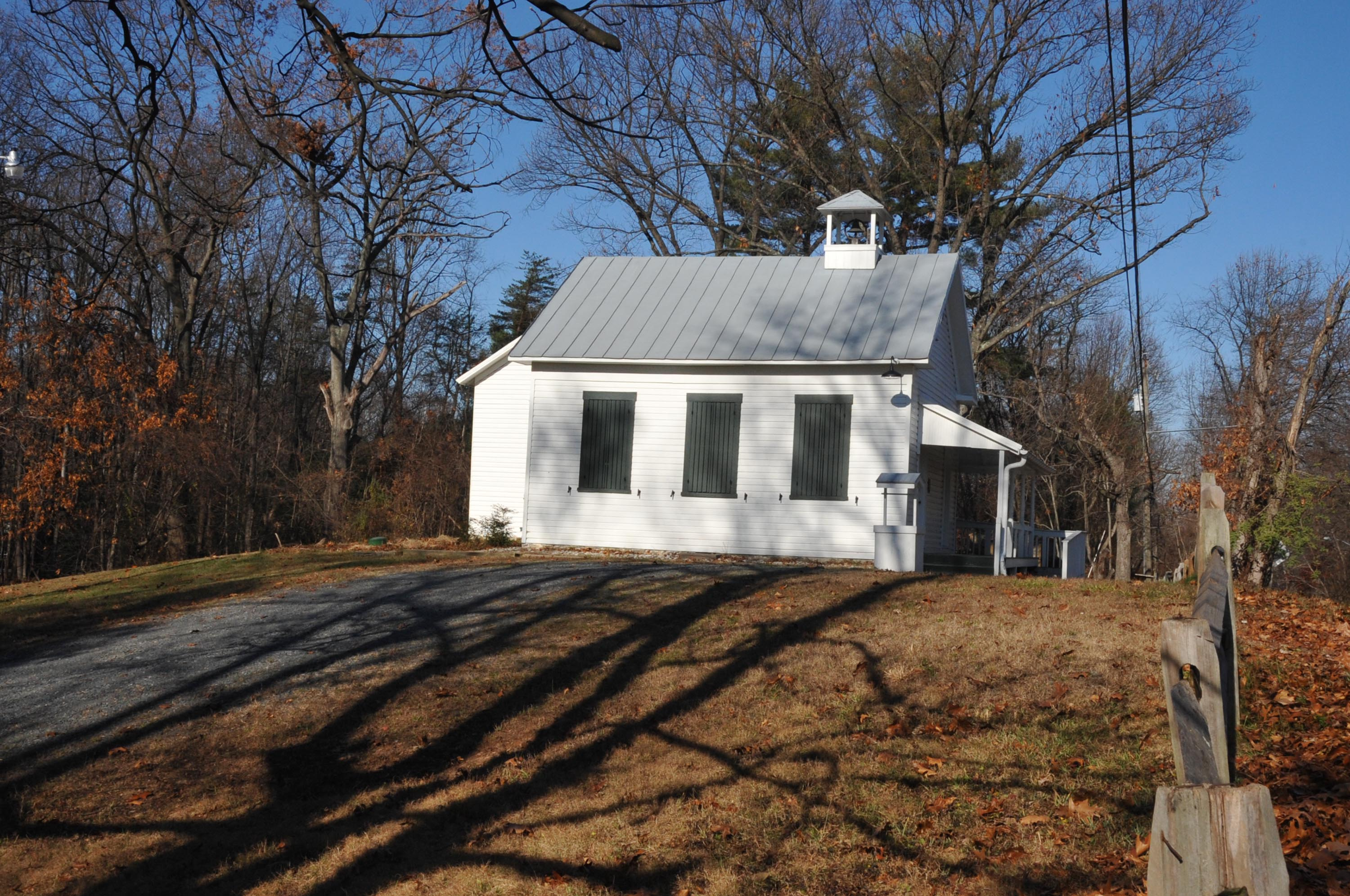
- Vale School-Community House, November 2012

- Location within Northern Virginia Location within Virginia Location within the United States
- Location: 3124 Fox Mill Rd., Oakton, Virginia
- Coordinates: 38°53′29″N 77°20′56″W
- Area: 1.82 acres (0.74 ha)
- Built: c. 1884
- Architectural style: One-room school
- NRHP reference No.: 11000349
- VLR No.: 029-5615

Significant dates
- Added to NRHP: June 8, 2011
- Designated VLR: March 17, 2011

Vale School-Community House is a historic two-room school located near Oakton, Fairfax County, Virginia. It was built about 1884 and expanded with a second room in 1912. It is a one-story, two-room, wood-frame building on a stone and concrete foundation. It has a gable front with overhanging eaves, topped by a belfry with the school bell. Also on the property is a well built in 1951 and the former location of a privy constructed in 1884. The school closed in 1931 and was reopened as a Community House by the Vale Home Demonstration Club in 1935. The founder of the Vale Club was Florence Jodzies who has been honored via historical marker. In 2018, Mrs Jodzies was included on the Wall of Honor of The Virginia Women’s Monument, located in Richmond's Capitol Square.

It was listed on the National Register of Historic Places in 2011.
