= Tower House (Alexandria, Virginia) =

Historic house in Virginia, United States

- U.S. National Register of Historic Places
- Virginia Landmarks Register
- Fairfax County Inventory of Historic Sites
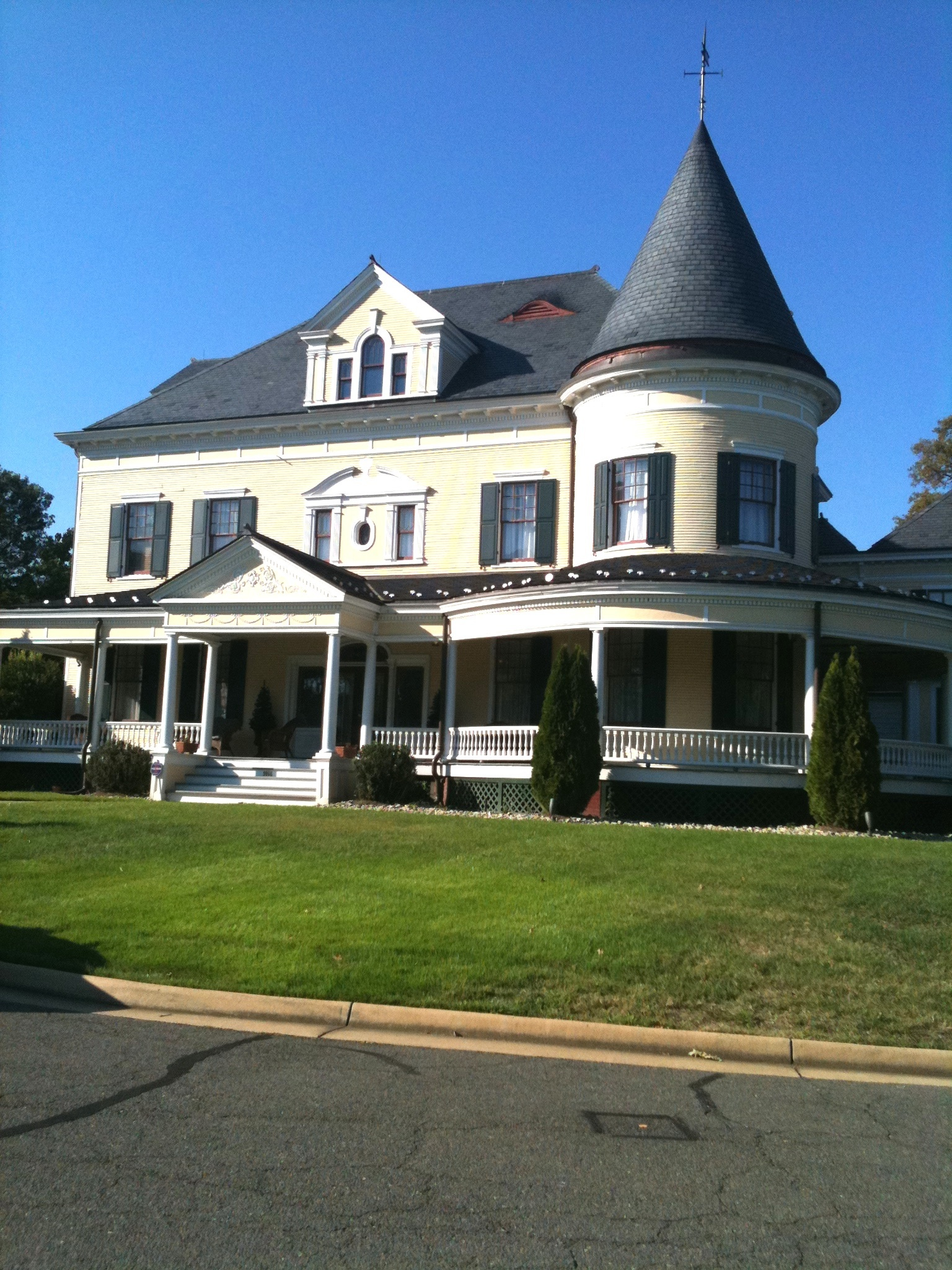
- Tower House, November 2012

- Location within Northern Virginia Location within Virginia Location within the United States
- Location: 9066 Tower House Place, south of Alexandria, Virginia
- Coordinates: 38°42′41″N 77°4′2″W
- Area: 1.2 acres (0.49 ha)
- Built: 1888, 1900-1901
- Architectural style: Queen Anne, Colonial Revival
- NRHP reference No.: 06000341
- VLR No.: 029-0151

Significant dates
- Added to NRHP: May 2, 2006
- Designated VLR: March 8, 2006
- Designated FCIHS: September 12, 1972

Tower House, also known as Edgewater and Marsland-on-the-Potomac, is a historic home located near Alexandria, in Fairfax County, Virginia. The original portion was built in 1888 by John Young, who inherited the land from his father, Lewis, in 1879. At that time it was in the Italian Villa style. An addition was added to the rear in 1888-9 by owner, Isaac N. Jones. The house was remodeled to its present form in 1900-1901 by railroad executive James Yeomans. James A. Drain, Sr. owned it from 1920 until 1936. He renamed it Marsland-on-the-Potomac after the maiden name of his wife Ethel. From 1941 until 1994, the religious group Baraca Philathea used it for various purposes. Since then, it has undergone extensive restoration by its present owner. It is a 2 1/2-story frame dwelling in a transitional Queen Anne-Colonial Revival style. It features a steeply pitched hipped roof and a prominent, semi-circular corner tower.

It was listed on the National Register of Historic Places in 2006.
