= McLean, Virginia =

Unincorporated community in Virginia, US

- Census-designated place and unincorporated community
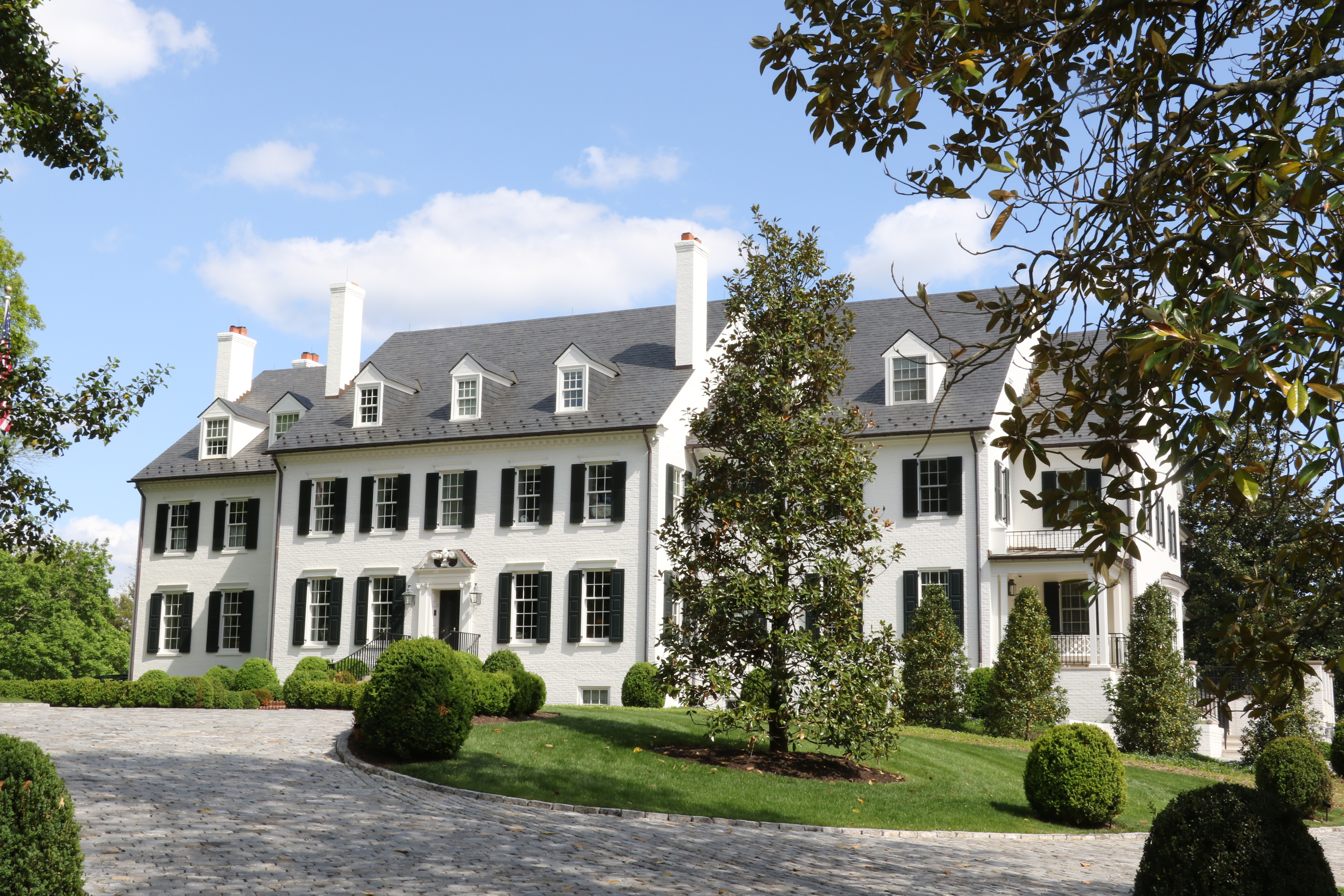
- Hickory Hill

- Location of McLean in Virginia (left) and in Fairfax County, Virginia (right)

- Location within Northern Virginia Location within Virginia Location within the United States
- Coordinates: 38°56′03″N 77°10′39″W
- Country: United States
- State: Virginia
- County: Fairfax

Area
  - Total: 24.9 sq mi (64.4 km^{2})
  - Land: 24.8 sq mi (64.2 km^{2})
  - Water: 0.089 sq mi (0.23 km^{2})
- Elevation: 285 ft (87 m)

Population (2020)
  - Total: 50,773
  - Density: 2,050/sq mi (791/km^{2})
- Time zone: UTC−5 (Eastern (EST))
  - Summer (DST): UTC−4 (EDT)
- ZIP Codes: 22101–22103, 22106
- Area codes: 571, 703
- FIPS code: 51-48376
- GNIS feature ID: 1495919

McLean (/məˈkleɪn/ mə-KLAYN) is an unincorporated community and census-designated place (CDP) in Fairfax County, Virginia, United States. The community's population was 50,773 at the 2020 census. It is located between the Potomac River and Vienna within the Washington metropolitan area.

McLean is home to many wealthy residents, such as diplomats, military, members of Congress, and high-ranking government officials. It is the location of Hickory Hill, the former home of Ethel Kennedy. It is also the location of Salona, the former home of Light-Horse Harry Lee.

== History ==
The community received its name from John Roll McLean, the former publisher and owner of The Washington Post. Along with Stephen Benton Elkins in 1902, he bought the charter for the Great Falls and Old Dominion Railroad. Completed in 1906, it connected the area with Washington, D.C. McLean named a railroad station costing $1,500, of which $500 was raised locally, after himself, where the rail line (traveling on the present route of Old Dominion Drive) crossed the old Chain Bridge Road. The community itself was founded in 1910, when the communities of Lewinsville and Langley merged.

== Geography ==
McLean is located on the Capital Beltway (Interstate 495) in Northern Virginia, central McLean is 8 miles (13 km) northwest of downtown Washington, D.C., and 9 miles (14 km) northeast of Fairfax, the county seat.

The community lies in the Piedmont upland on the west bank of the Potomac River. The river forms the community's northern and eastern borders, and a number of its smaller tributaries flow north and northeast through the CDP. From west to east, these include Bull Neck Run, Scott Run, Dead Run, Turkey Run, and Pimmit Run.

According to the United States Census Bureau, the CDP has a total area of 24.88 square miles (64.4 km^{2}) of which 24.79 square miles (64.2 km^{2}) is land and 0.09 square miles (0.23 km^{2}) is water.

As an inner suburb of Washington, D.C., McLean is a part of both the Washington Metropolitan Area and the larger Baltimore-Washington Metropolitan Area. The CDP includes the unincorporated communities of Langley, Lewinsville, and West McLean. It borders several other Washington suburbs including: Potomac and Cabin John, Maryland, to the north; Brookmont, Maryland, to the northeast; Arlington to the southeast; Falls Church to the south; Idylwood, Pimmit Hills, and Tysons to the southwest; Wolf Trap to the west; and Great Falls to the northwest.

McLean has a humid climate (Cfa) and is in hardiness zone 7a.

== Demographics ==
Historical population
Census	Pop.	Note	%±
1950	1,094		—
1970	17,698		—
1980	35,664		101.5%
1990	38,168		7.0%
2000	38,929		2.0%
2010	48,115		23.6%
2020	50,773		5.5%
U.S. Decennial Census; 1940 1950 1960 1970; 1980 1990 2000; 2010

McLean was first listed as an unincorprated community in the 1950 U.S. census. The community did not appear in the 1960 U.S. census. It was listed as a census designated place in the 1980 U.S. census.

=== Racial and ethnic composition ===
McLean CDP, Virginia – Racial composition Note: the US Census treats Hispanic/Latino as an ethnic category. This table excludes Latinos from the racial categories and assigns them to a separate category. Hispanics/Latinos may be of any race.
Race (NH = Non-Hispanic)	2020	2010	2000	1990	1980
White alone (NH)	64.7% (32,845)	75.4% (36,273)	81.3% (31,667)	84.8% (32,372)	89.9% (32,039)
Black alone (NH)	2% (996)	1.8% (851)	1.5% (602)	1.7% (635)	0.9% (303)
American Indian alone (NH)	0.1% (30)	0.1% (48)	0.1% (29)	0.1% (56)	0.1% (39)
Asian alone (NH)	21% (10,658)	14.9% (7,156)	10.6% (4,124)	9.1% (3,488)	4.8% (1,717)
Pacific Islander alone (NH)	0% (17)	0% (14)	0% (12)		
Other race alone (NH)	0.7% (353)	0.3% (145)	0.2% (81)	0% (14)	0.4% (159)
Multiracial (NH)	5.6% (2,856)	2.7% (1,293)	2.2% (850)	—	—
Hispanic/Latino (any race)	5.9% (3,018)	4.9% (2,335)	4% (1,564)	4.2% (1,603)	3.9% (1,385)

=== 2020 census ===
As of the 2020 census, McLean had a population of 50,773. The median age was 45.3 years. 26.1% of residents were under the age of 18 and 20.1% of residents were 65 years of age or older. For every 100 females there were 93.9 males, and for every 100 females age 18 and over there were 90.1 males age 18 and over.

99.3% of residents lived in urban areas, while 0.7% lived in rural areas.

There were 17,044 households in McLean, of which 40.2% had children under the age of 18 living in them. Of all households, 71.5% were married-couple households, 8.9% were households with a male householder and no spouse or partner present, and 17.9% were households with a female householder and no spouse or partner present. About 16.6% of all households were made up of individuals and 11.0% had someone living alone who was 65 years of age or older.

There were 17,948 housing units, of which 5.0% were vacant. The homeowner vacancy rate was 1.1% and the rental vacancy rate was 7.2%.

Racial composition as of the 2020 census
Race	Number	Percent
White	33,455	65.9%
Black or African American	1,030	2.0%
American Indian and Alaska Native	70	0.1%
Asian	10,686	21.0%
Native Hawaiian and Other Pacific Islander	27	0.1%
Some other race	710	1.4%
Two or more races	4,795	9.4%

=== 2010 census ===
There were 17,063 households, out of which 39.6% had children under the age of 18 living with them, 70.5% were married couples living together, 2.4% had a male householder with no wife present, 6.0% had a female householder with no husband present, and 21.2% were non-families. Of all households, 18.0% were individuals, and 10.3% had someone who was 65 or older living alone. The average household size was 2.80, and the average family size was 3.17.

The median age was 45.1 years. 26.9% of the population was under 18, 4.3% was 18 to 24, 18.6% was 25 to 44, 33.2% was 45 to 64, and 17.0% were 65 or older. The gender makeup of the community was 48.2% male and 51.8% female.

The median income for a household in the CDP was $164,888, and the median income for a family was $194,832. Males had a median income of $132,714 versus $87,663 for females. The per capita income for the CDP was $87,073. About 1.3% of families and 2.6% of the population were below the poverty line, including 2.6% of those under 18 and 3.2% of those 65 and older.

=== 2012 estimates ===
As of 2012, 61.6% of the population over 16 was in the workforce. 0.4% was in the armed forces, and 61.2% was in the civilian workforce, with 58.4% employed and 2.9% unemployed. The occupational composition of the employed civilian labor force was: 73.2% in management, business, science, and arts; 17.9% in sales and office occupations; 5.5% in service occupations; 2.0% in natural resources, construction, and maintenance; 1.4% in production, transportation, and material moving. The three industries employing the largest percentages of the working civilian labor force were: professional, scientific, and management, and administrative and waste management services (27.8%); educational services, health care, and social assistance (17.7%); and public administration (16.6%).

The cost of living in McLean is very high; compared to a U.S. average of 100, the cost of living index for the community is 142.6. As of 2012, the median home value in the community was $908,000, the median selected monthly owner cost was $3,803 for housing units with a mortgage and $1,000+ for those without, and the median gross rent was $2,000+.

== Economy ==
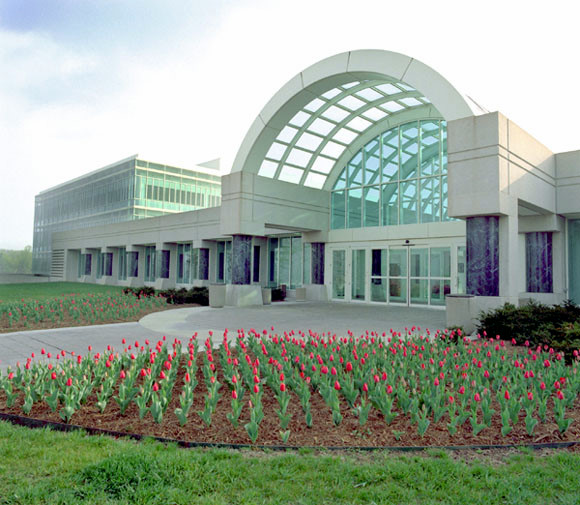
The Central Intelligence Agency headquarters

Mars and Geebo are among the companies based in McLean. Many businesses in neighboring Tysons, particularly those east of Leesburg Pike (VA Route 7), have a McLean mailing address, because the US Postal Service boundary for West McLean (ZIP Code 22102) generally follows Leesburg Pike.

The headquarters of the Central Intelligence Agency is located in the Langley area of McLean, and the headquarters of the Office of the Director of National Intelligence is also located in McLean. The U.S. Department of Transportation's Turner-Fairbank Highway Research Center is also located down the street from the CIA headquarters.

== Arts and culture ==
Fairfax County Public Library operates the Dolley Madison Library in McLean.

== Parks and recreation ==
The McLean Little League is also located in McLean. In 2005, the girls' All-Star softball team from McLean Little League won the Little League Softball World Series Championship in Portland, Oregon. MLL's girls' All-Star softball team has been the Little League Softball World Series runner-up twice, in 2004 and in 2013. The Mount Daniel School Park, operated by The City of Falls Church, is physically within the McLean CDP. Clemyjontri Park opened in 2006.

== Education ==
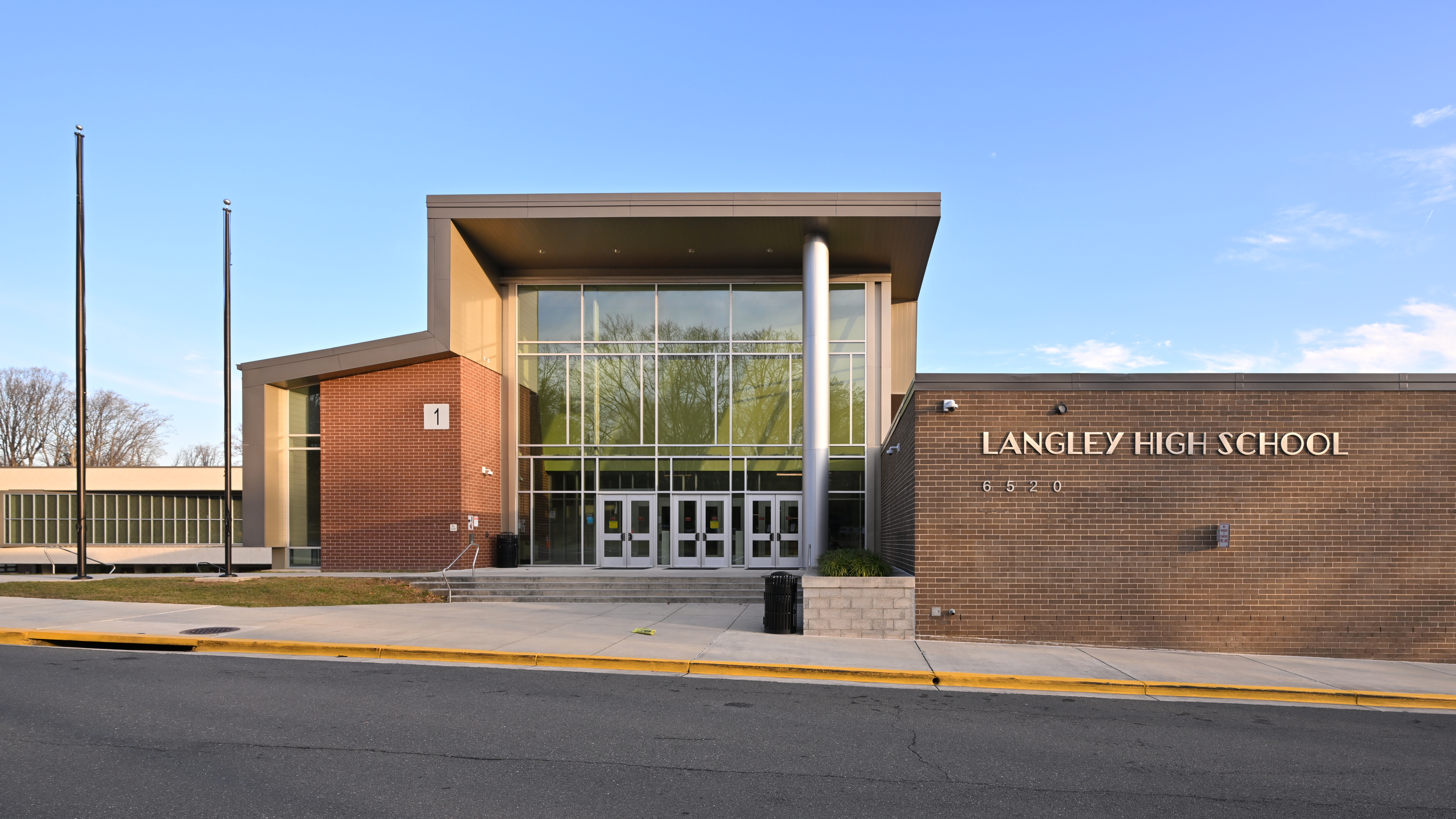
Langley High School is one of two high schools within the McLean CDP.

=== Public primary and secondary schools ===
McLean residents are zoned to schools in the Fairfax County Public Schools. These include:

- Chesterbrook; Churchill Road; Haycock; Kent Gardens; Franklin Sherman, and Spring Hill elementary schools.
- James Fenimore Cooper Middle School and Henry Wadsworth Longfellow Middle School.
- Langley High School and McLean High School.

Mount Daniel School of the Falls Church City Public Schools is in McLean.

=== Private primary and secondary schools ===
Several private schools, ranging from pre-school to 12th grade, are located in McLean, including The Langley School, The Madeira School, Potomac School, Oakcrest School, Saint Luke Catholic School, Saint John School, Brooksfield Montessori, The Montessori School of McLean, and The Country Day School.

== Infrastructure ==
=== Transportation ===
==== Highways and roads ====
The Capital Beltway, George Washington Memorial Parkway, Interstate 66, Dulles Access Road, Dolley Madison Boulevard/Chain Bridge Road, Georgetown Pike, and Old Dominion Drive all run through McLean.

==== Subways and buses ====
The Washington Metro's Silver Line is southwest of downtown McLean. Both the Silver and Orange lines physically enter the borders in between East Falls Church and West Falls Church. The McLean station on the Silver Line is in the McLean CDP but lies along VA Route 123 about two miles west of downtown McLean. Other Metro stations nearby include West Falls Church on the Orange Line, East Falls Church on both the Silver and Orange Lines, and the Tysons station on the Silver Line, which also has a McLean address.

WMATA (Metrobus) and Fairfax Connector each have several bus routes traveling through McLean, including routes connecting downtown McLean with the McLean Metrorail station.
