= Great Falls, Virginia =

- Census-designated place
- Location of Great Falls in Fairfax County, Virginia

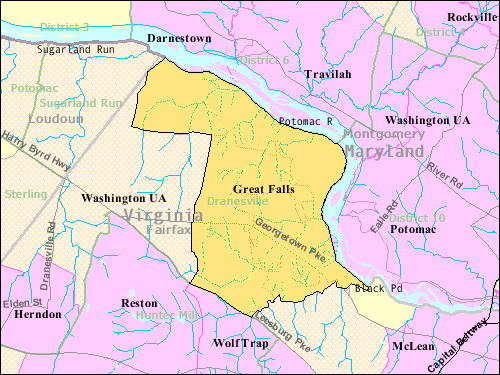
- Boundaries of the Great Falls CDP as of 2003

- Location within Northern Virginia Location within Virginia Location within the United States
- Coordinates: 38°59′53″N 77°17′18″W
- Country: United States
- State: Virginia
- County: Fairfax

Area
  - Total: 25.66 sq mi (66.5 km^{2})
  - Land: 25.42 sq mi (65.8 km^{2})
  - Water: 0.24 sq mi (0.62 km^{2})
- Elevation: 344 ft (105 m)

Population (2020)
  - Total: 15,953
  - Density: 628/sq mi (242.4/km^{2})
- Time zone: UTC-5 (Eastern (EST))
  - Summer (DST): UTC-4 (EDT)
- ZIP code: 22066
- Area codes: 703, 571
- FIPS code: 51-32496
- GNIS feature ID: 1467429

Great Falls is a census-designated place in Fairfax County, Virginia, United States. The population at the 2020 census was 15,953. It is named for the nearby Great Falls of the Potomac River.

== History ==
Colonial farm settlements began to form in the area as early as the late 1700s.

Early on, the village was known as Forestville (unofficially, since there was already a Forestville with a Post Office), but was renamed Great Falls in 1955.

== Geography ==
Great Falls is located on Virginia State Route 7 in Northern Virginia, Great Falls is 15 miles (24 km) west-northwest of downtown Washington, D.C., and 10.5 miles (16.9 km) north of Fairfax, the county seat.

Great Falls lies in the Piedmont upland on the right bank of the Potomac River. The Potomac River forms the northern and eastern borders of the CDP, and several of its tributaries flow north and east through the CDP. From north to south, these include Nichols Run, Clarks Branch, and Difficult Run. Difficult Run (along with Leesburg Pike) forms the southern border of the CDP. Two of its tributaries, Captain Hickory Run and Piney Run, flow southeast through the southern part of the CDP. The Great Falls of the Potomac River, the community's namesake, are on the east side of the CDP.

According to the United States Census Bureau, the CDP has a total area of 25.66 square miles (66.5 km^{2}) of which 25.42 square miles (65.8 km^{2}) is land and 0.24 square miles (0.62 km^{2}) is water.

As a suburb of Washington, D.C., Great Falls is a part of both the Washington Metropolitan Area and the larger Baltimore-Washington Metropolitan Area. It is bordered on all sides by other Washington suburbs, including: Darnestown and Travilah, Maryland to the north, Potomac, Maryland to the east, McLean to the southeast, Wolf Trap to the south, Reston and Dranesville to the southwest, Sterling to the west, and Lowes Island to the northwest.

== Demographics ==
Historical population
Census	Pop.	Note	%±
1990	6,945		—
2000	8,549		23.1%
2010	15,427		80.5%
2020	15,953		3.4%
* U.S. Decennial Census

=== Racial and ethnic composition ===
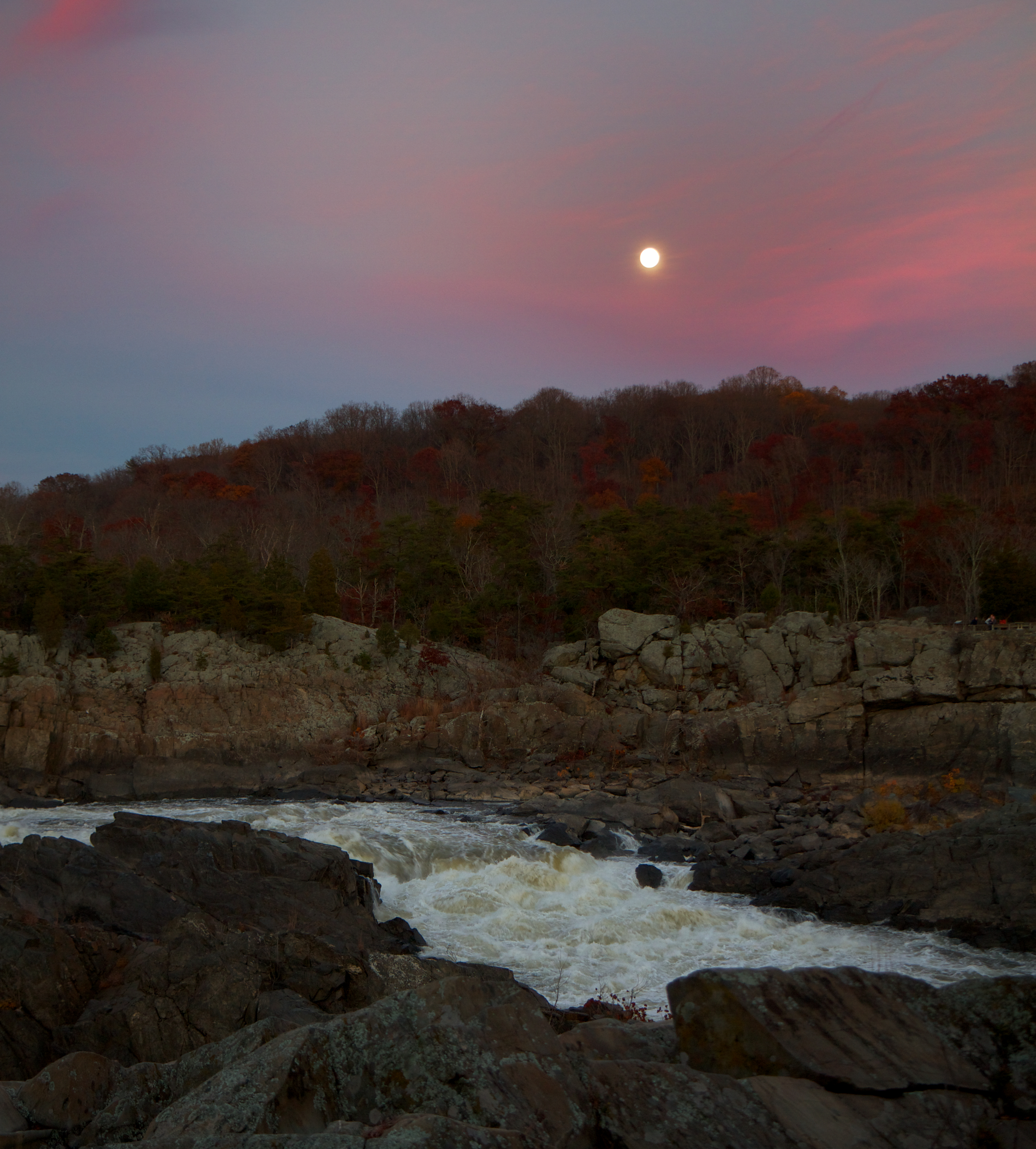
Full moon at Great Falls Park from the Virginia side

Great Falls, Virginia – Racial and ethnic composition Note: the US Census treats Hispanic/Latino as an ethnic category. This table excludes Latinos from the racial categories and assigns them to a separate category. Hispanics/Latinos may be of any race.
Race / Ethnicity (NH = Non-Hispanic)	Pop 1980	Pop 2000	Pop 2010	Pop 2020	% 1980	% 2000	% 2010	% 2020
White alone (NH)	2,317	7,423	11,939	10,659	95.78%	86.83%	77.39%	66.82%
Black or African American alone (NH)	18	98	268	300	0.74%	1.15%	1.74%	1.88%
Native American or Alaska Native alone (NH)	3 (Note: Includes all people who gave "American Indian", "Eskimo", or "Aleut" as their race, regardless of Hispanic identity.)	9	10	21	0.12%	0.11%	0.06%	0.13%
Asian alone (NH)	37 (Note: Includes all people who gave "Japanese", "Chinese", "Filipino", "Korean", "Asian Indian", or "Vietnamese" as their race, regardless of Hispanic identity.)	633	2,082	3,160	1.53%	7.4%	13.5%	19.81%
Native Hawaiian or Pacific Islander alone (NH)	0 (Note: Includes all people who gave "Hawaiian", "Guamanian", or "Samoan" as their race, regardless of Hispanic identity.)	3	3	3	0%	0.04%	0.02%	0.02%
Other race alone (NH)		14	45	99		0.16%	0.29%	0.62%
Mixed race or Multiracial (NH)		150	477	864		1.75%	3.09%	5.42%
Hispanic or Latino (any race)	35	219	603	847	1.45%	2.56%	3.91%	5.31%
Total	2,419	8,549	15,427	15,953	100.00%	100.00%	100.00%	100.00%

=== 2020 census ===
As of the 2020 census, Great Falls had a population of 15,953. There were 5,064 households and 5,273 housing units. The median age was 45.9 years. 24.2% of residents were under the age of 18 and 19.2% of residents were 65 years of age or older. For every 100 females there were 99.2 males, and for every 100 females age 18 and over there were 96.4 males age 18 and over.

The population density was 627.6 inhabitants per square mile (242.4/km^{2}). The average housing unit density was 207.4 per square mile (80.1/km^{2}).

80.2% of residents lived in urban areas, while 19.8% lived in rural areas.

Of the households, 39.5% had children under the age of 18 living in them. Of all households, 79.3% were married-couple households, 8.0% were households with a male householder and no spouse or partner present, and 10.6% were households with a female householder and no spouse or partner present. About 9.3% of all households were made up of individuals and 5.4% had someone living alone who was 65 years of age or older. The average family household had 3.13 people.

There were 5,273 housing units, of which 4.0% were vacant. The homeowner vacancy rate was 1.1% and the rental vacancy rate was 9.3%.

=== Demographic estimates ===
This section includes some information from the 2022 American Community Survey.

The largest ancestry is the 16.3% who had English ancestry, 29.7% spoke a language other than English at home, and 24.5% were born outside the United States, 77.7% of whom were naturalized citizens.

The median income for a household in the CDP was over $250,000. 7.9% of the population were military veterans, and 84.5% had a bachelor's degree or higher. In the CDP 2.3% of the population was below the poverty line, including 1.5% of those under the age of 18 and 3.2% of those aged 65 or over, with 4.0% of the population without health insurance.

=== 2010 census ===
As of the 2010 census, there were 15,427 people, 4,977 households, and 4,439 families residing in the CDP. The population density was 606.9 inhabitants per square mile (234.3/km^{2}). There were 5,179 housing units at an average density of 203.7 per square mile (78.6/km^{2}). The racial makeup of the community was 80.5% White, 13.5% Asian, 1.8% African American, 0.1% American Indian, 0.0% Pacific Islander, 0.6% from other races, and 3.4% from two or more races. Hispanic or Latino residents of any race were 3.9% of the population.

There were 4,977 households, of which 46.1% had children under the age of 18 living with them, 82.1% were married couples living together, 4.7% had a female householder with no husband present, and 10.8% were non-families. Of all households, 8.5% were made up of individuals, and 3.7% had someone living alone who was 65 years of age or older. The average household size was 3.10, and the average family size was 3.27.

The age distribution of the population was 29.2% under the age of 18, 5.1% from 18 to 24, 15.9% from 25 to 44, 37.3% from 45 to 64, and 12.5% who were 65 years of age or older. The median age was 44.8 years. The gender makeup of the CDP was 50.3% male and 49.7% female.

The median income for a household in the CDP was $189,545, and the median income for a family was $201,250. Males had a median income of $149,609 versus $101,289 for females. The community's per capita income was $80,422. About 0.8% of families and 1.8% of the population were below the poverty line, including 0.7% of those under age 18 and 4.7% of those age 65 or over.

In 2010, the Census extended the CDP's western border from Springvale Road to the Fairfax-Loudoun County Line, expanding the CDP's area by approximately 40%. This extension partly explains the CDP's population increase of 80.5% since the 2000 Census.

Great Falls vote by party in presidential elections
Year	Democratic	Republican	Third Parties
2020	58.37% 5,950	39.48% 4,024	2.15% 219
2016	51.79% 4,954	41.46% 3,966	6.74% 645
2012	43.81% 3,339	55.41% 4,223	0.78% 59
2008	47.62% 3,477	51.75% 3,778	0.63% 46
2004	44.55% 3,378	55.03% 4,173	0.42% 32
2000	38.12% 2,662	58.59% 4,091	3.29% 230
1996	36.59% 2,207	58.92% 3,554	4.49% 271
1992	33.73% 1,979	52.40% 3,075	13.87% 814

== Parks and recreation ==
Although Great Falls is primarily a bedroom community for Washington, D.C., one major attraction is Great Falls Park which overlooks the Great Falls of the Potomac River, for which the community and the park are named. George Washington was involved with building a canal around the falls on the southwest, or Virginia, side, called the Patowmack Canal, which did not become commercially viable. Remnants of the canal and of a village around the canal named Matildaville are still visible in the park. The Great Falls and Old Dominion Railroad extended along Old Dominion Drive to Great Falls Park in 1906.

River Bend County Park is another gathering area in Great Falls, as is the Village Green, which hosts community celebrations around Easter (Spring Festival, including an Egg Hunt), Fourth of July, Halloween, Thanksgiving, and Christmas (Tree Lighting), as well as concerts in the summer.

== Education ==
Fairfax County Public Schools operates the local public schools. Great Falls students attend Great Falls Elementary School, Forestville Elementary School or Colvin Run Elementary School. These schools feed into James Fenimore Cooper Middle School, which then feeds into Langley High School.

Siena Academy is a Catholic Montessori preschool and elementary school in Great Falls, under the authority of the Diocese of Arlington. It is the only private K-12 school in the town.

Fairfax County Public Library operates the Great Falls Library.

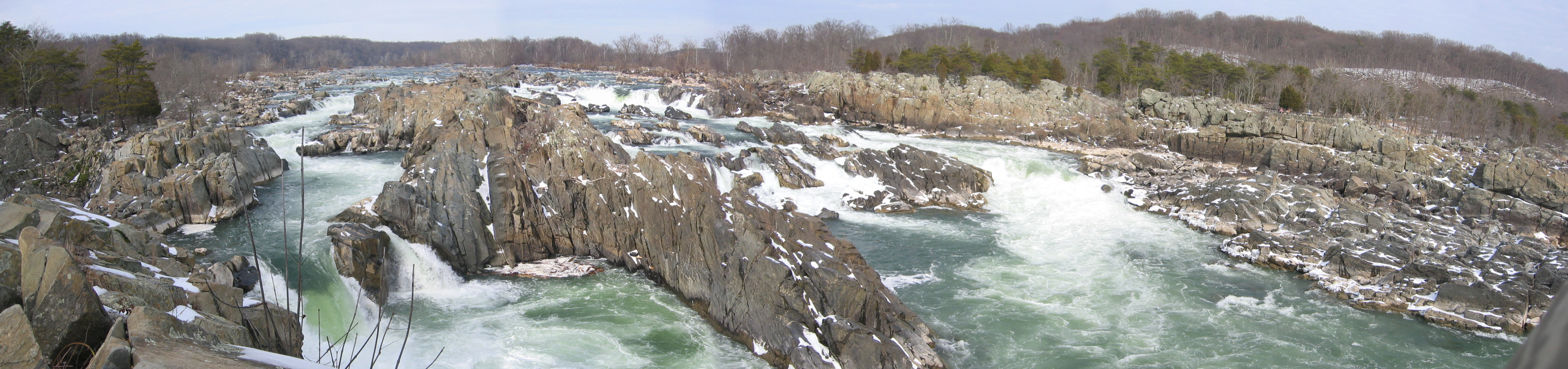
Great Falls

== Infrastructure ==
The main roads serving Great Falls are Virginia State Route 7 (Leesburg Pike) and Virginia State Route 193 (Georgetown Pike).

== In popular culture ==
In The Real Housewives of Potomac season 3, a cast member moved to Great Falls.
