= Gunnell =

Gunnell is a surname. Notable people with the name include:

- Adrian Gunnell (born 1972), English snooker player
- Allen Thomson Gunnell (1848–1907), American lawyer, judge, and politician
- David Gunnell, English epidemiologist
- Grant Gunnell (born 1999), American football player
- John Gunnell (1933–2008), Labour Party politician
- John Gunnell (cricketer), English cricketer
- John T. Gunnell (1836–1902), American politician
- Edna Mary Gunnell (1879–1963), English horticulturalist
- Micah Gunnell (born 1980), American comic artist and animation director
- Rich Gunnell (born 1987), American football player
- Richard Gunnell (fl. 1613–1634), English actor, playwright and theatre manager
- Robert Gunnell (1927–2014), British broadcaster
- Sally Gunnell (born 1966), British track and field athlete
- W. Gunnell (Surrey cricketer), English cricketer

== See also ==
- John Gunnell House
- William Gunnell House (disambiguation)
- Gunnel (given name)
