= Gunnel (given name) =

Gunnel is a Swedish feminine given name, a variant of Gunhild. Notable people with the name include:

- Gunnel Adlercreutz (born 1941), Finnish architect
- Gunnel Ahlin (1918–2007), Swedish writer
- Gunnel André (born 1946), Swedish theologian
- Gunnel Broström (1921–2012), Swedish actress
- Gunnel Carlson (born 1956), Swedish writer
- Gunnel Cederlöf (born 1960), professor and working member
- Gunnel Fred (born 1955), Swedish actress
- Gunnel Gummeson (1930–1977), Swedish educator; missing since 1956
- Gunnel Hazelius-Berg (1905–1997), Swedish writer
- Gunnel Johansson (1922–2013), Swedish gymnast
- Gunnel Jonäng (1921–2008), Swedish politician
- Gunnel Lindblom (1931–2021), Swedish actress
- Gunnel Linde (1924–2014), Swedish writer
- Gunnel Nyman (1909–1948), Finnish glass artist and designer
- Gunnel Pettersson (born 1960), Swedish artist
- Gunnel Vallquist (1918–2016), Swedish writer and translator

== See also ==
- Gunnel (disambiguation)
- Gunnell, surname
