= Gunhild =

Gunhild (with variants Gundhild, Gunhilda, Gunhilde, Gunhjild, Gunilda, Gunnhild, Gunnhildr, Gunnhildur) is a Germanic feminine given name composed of two words meaning "war" (gunn and hild/hildr).

Notable people with these names include:

- Gunhild (Danish queen), allegedly a Danish queen consort, wife of Harald Bluetooth
- Gunhild of Wenden, wife of Sweyn I of Denmark
- Gunhild of Wessex, (1055–1097), eldest daughter of Harold Godwinson and Edith the Fair
- Gunhild Carling (born 1975), Swedish jazz musician
- Gunhild Kyle (1921–2016), Swedish historian
- Gunhild Rosén (1855–1928), Swedish ballerina
- Gunhilda of Denmark, daughter of Canute the Great and wife of Henry III, Holy Roman Emperor
- Gunhild Haraldsdatter (died 1002), said to have been the sister of Sweyn Forkbeard, King of Denmark
- Gunnhild, Mother of Kings, wife of Erik Bloodaxe
- Gunnhildr Sveinsdóttir, queen consort of Denmark and Sweden

== See also ==
- 891 Gunhild, an asteroid in the Asteroid Belt
- Gunhild (clothing), a French clothing brand
- Gunilda, a steel yacht which sank on Lake Superior
- Domina Gunilda, a weapon of remarkable size at Windsor Castle in the 1300s; considered the origin of the word "gun"
- The name of the London area "Gunnersbury" means "Manor house of a woman called Gunnhildr", and is from an old Scandinavian personal name + Middle English -bury, manor or manor house.
- Gunnel, Swedish name derived from Gunhild
