= Gunnels =

Gunnels is an English surname. Notable people with the surname include:

- Douglas Gunnels (born 1948), American politician in Tennessee
- Riley Gunnels (1937–2024), American football player

== See also ==
- Gunnel
