= Cecilia Lundqvist =

Swedish artist

- Born: 1971 (age 54–55); Eskilstuna, Sweden
- Website: cecilialundqvist.com

Cecilia Lundqvist (born 1971 in Eskilstuna) is a Swedish artist, working exclusively with animation. She is best known for the short films "Trim" (1997), "Souvenir" (1999) and "Emblem" (2001). In 2004 she received Filmform's Honorary Award .

Lundqvist's films can be found in the collections of Centre Georges Pompidou in Paris and Moderna Museet in Stockholm.

== Notable works ==
- Power Play (2004)
- Smile (2003)
- C (2001)
- Emblem (2001)
- Beware of Playing Children (2000)
- Absolutely Normal (2000)
- Souvenir (1999)
- Rebus (1999)
- Trim (1999)
