= Suicide in India =

Suicide is a major national public health issue in India. 171,000 suicides were recorded in the country in 2022, registering a 4.2% increase over 2021 and a jump of 27% compared to 2018. The rate of suicide per 100,000 population increased to 12.4 in 2022 which is the highest year for this data. Suicides during 2022 increased by 27% in comparison to 2018 with India reporting the highest number of suicides in the world. India's contribution to global suicide deaths increased from 25.3% in 1990 to 36.6% in 2016 among women, and from 18.7% to 24.3% among men. In 2016, suicide was the most common cause of death in India in both the age groups of 15–29 years and 15–39 years. Daily wage earners accounted for 26% of suicide victims, the largest group in the suicide data.

The male-to-female suicide ratio in 2021 was 72.5 : 27.4.

Estimates for the number of suicides in India vary. For example, a study published in The Lancet projected 187,000 suicides in India in 2010, while official data by the Government of India claims 134,600 suicides in the same year. Similarly, for 2019, while NCRB reported India's suicide rate to be 10.4, according to WHO data, the estimated age-standardized suicide rate in India for the same year is 12.9. They have estimated it to be 11.1 for women and 14.7 for men.

== Definition ==
The Government of India classifies a death as suicide if it meets the following three criteria:

- death,
- the intent to die originated within the person,
- there is a reason for the person to end his or her life. The reason may or may not have been specified in a suicide note.

If one of these criteria is not met, the death may be classified as death because of illness, murder or in another statistical.

== NCRB data and the epidemiology of suicide in India ==
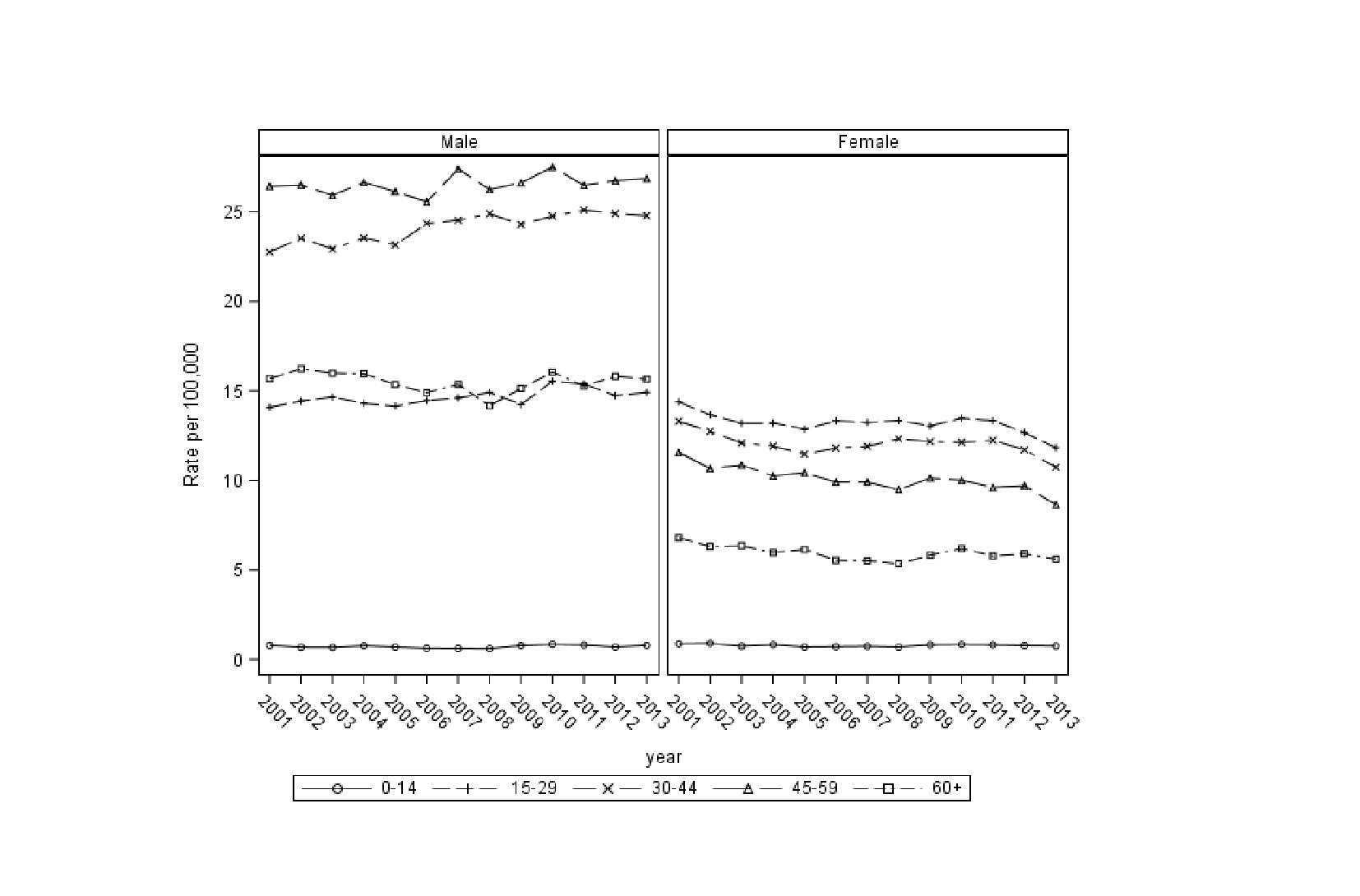
Age standardized male and female suicide rates by age, India, 2001-2013. Taken from Arya et al., 2018. https://doi.org/10.1007/s00127-017-1466-x

India is among the very few Low and Middle Income Countries (LMICs) with regular reports of suicide data through the NCRB publications. Dr. Vikas Arya (University of Melbourne) and colleagues (including Dr. Lakshmi Vijayakumar, Dr. Peter Mayer, Prof. Rakhi Dandona, Prof. Andrew Page, Prof. Ann John, Prof. David Gunnell, Prof. Jane Pirkis and Dr. Gregory Armstrong) have published various peer reviewed journal articles on the epidemiology of suicide in India based on the NCRB data.The results from some of their studies are discussed below.

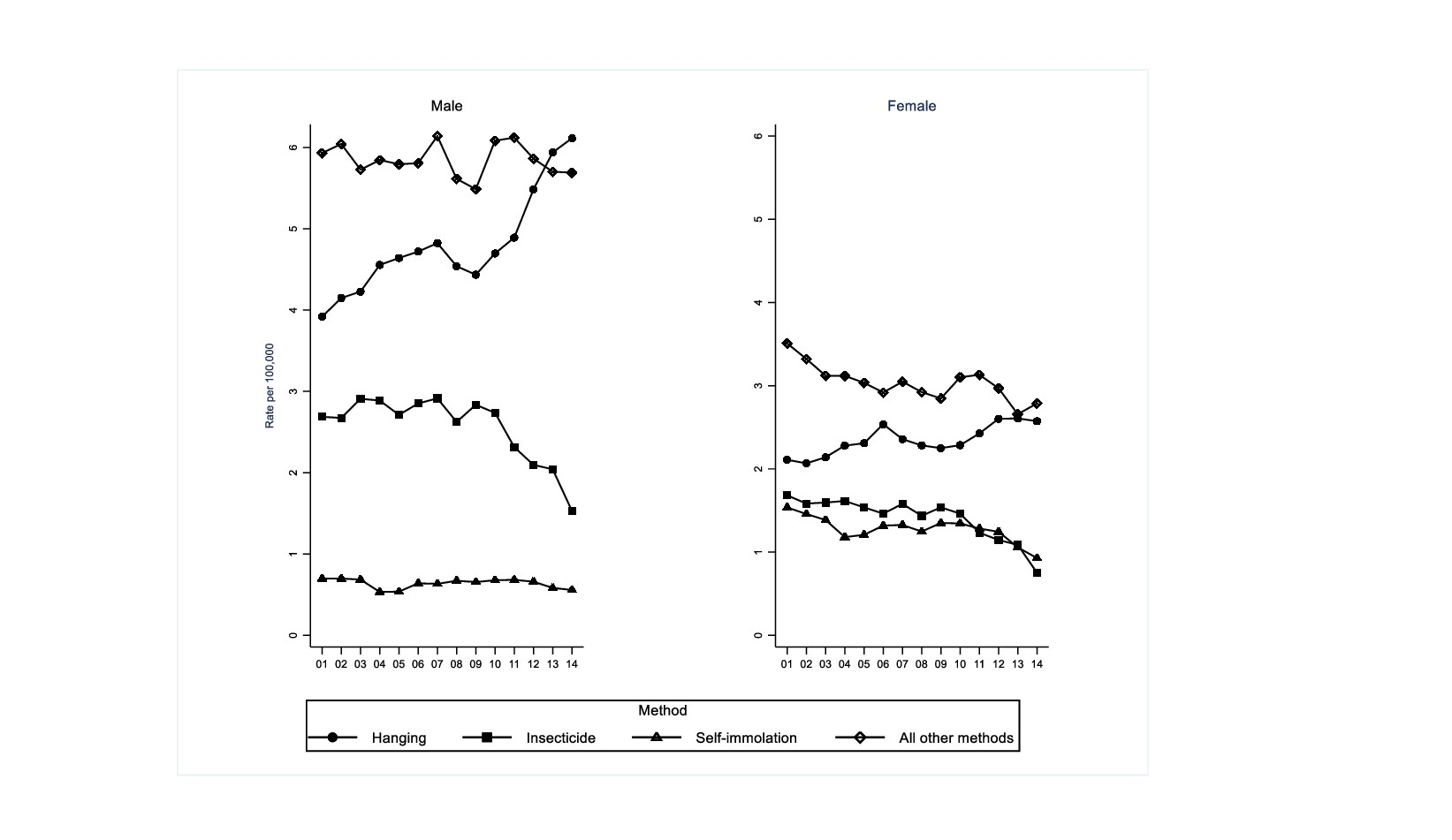
Age standardized male and female suicide rates by suicide methods, India, 2001-2014. Taken from Arya et al., 2019. https://doi.org/10.1016/j.jad.2019.07.005

Regarding trends, similar to most countries around the world, suicide rates are generally higher among males compared to females in India. Males have higher suicide rates in middle and older ages while the age group of 15–29 years has the highest suicide rate among females. On average, higher male and female suicide rates are observed in states with: higher levels of development, higher levels of agricultural employment, higher levels of literacy, and higher proportions of people identifying with Hinduism. Higher male suicide rates are also observed in states with higher levels of unemployment. Arya and colleagues suggest that the process of modernization and rapid social change with an increasing gap between expectations and reality might be contributing towards higher suicide risk in more developed parts of India. Also, ancient sanctions towards religious suicide are possibly still influencing modern Hindu suicides. Regarding high female suicide rates among the younger age-group, they suggest that the ongoing clash between traditional values and modern ways of living concerning issues such as age of marriage, and the value of individual decision making, along with patriarchal norms and sexual violence against women might be contributing factors. Regarding high male suicide rates among middle age groups, they suggest "that because males play the traditional role of—"breadwinners"—in India and failure to provide for the family during the middle age, for example, due to loss of employment, might result in higher suicide rates".

Regarding suicide rates in India by religion and caste status, suicide rates are higher among Christian and other religious groups compared with Hindus while they are also higher among general populations compared with SC, ST, and OBC populations. However, the results vary among different regions highlighting the substantial geographical heterogeneity of suicide rates across India by caste and religion. For example, ST populations have higher rates than general populations in Uttarakhand, Uttar Pradesh, and Kerala where their population is very low, while there are lower suicide rates than general populations in the northeastern states with very high proportions of ST populations. Authors suggest that lower suicide rates among ST and OBC populations in regions dominated by these groups might be explained through minority stress theory which suggests that the discrimination and hostile social environment toward minority populations are associated with increased mental health problems and suicidal behavior.

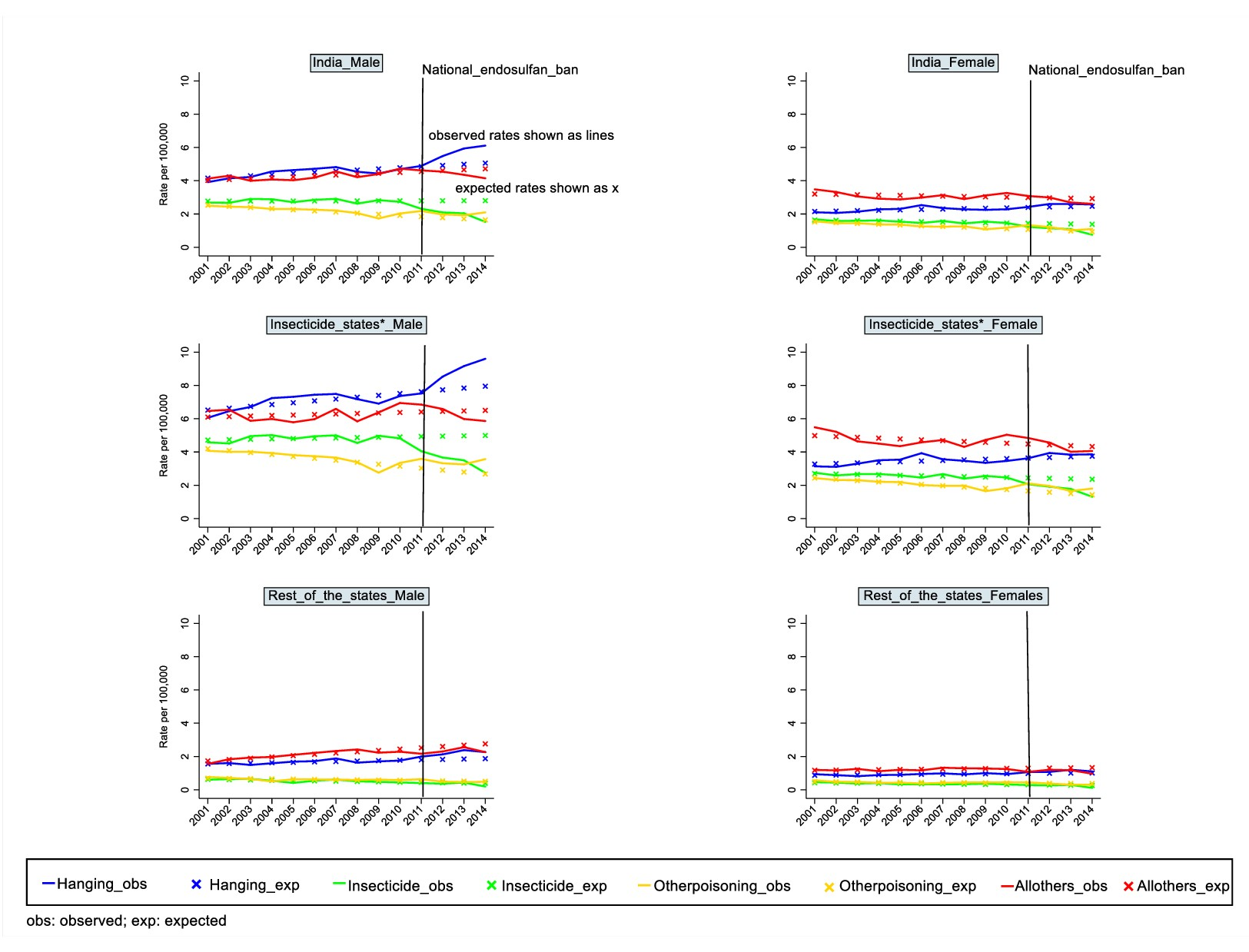
Observed and expected (based on linear trend forecasting) suicides rates in India between 2001–2014 by methods, sex, and region. Taken from Arya et al., 2021. https://doi.org/10.1016/j.jad.2020.09.085

Regarding suicide methods in India, hanging is the primary method of suicide in India and has shown increasing trends among both males and females between 2001-2021. Pesticide poisoning rates observed a downward trend, especially over 2011–2014 following a national ban on endosulfan (a commonly available pesticide). However, recently, pesticide poisoning rates appear to be trending upwards again among males. According to Arya and colleagues, ban on lethal pesticides must be prioritised to lower insecticide poisoning suicide rates. Also, responsible reporting of suicide by hanging in the media and limiting fictional portrayals of this method may be useful areas for prevention.

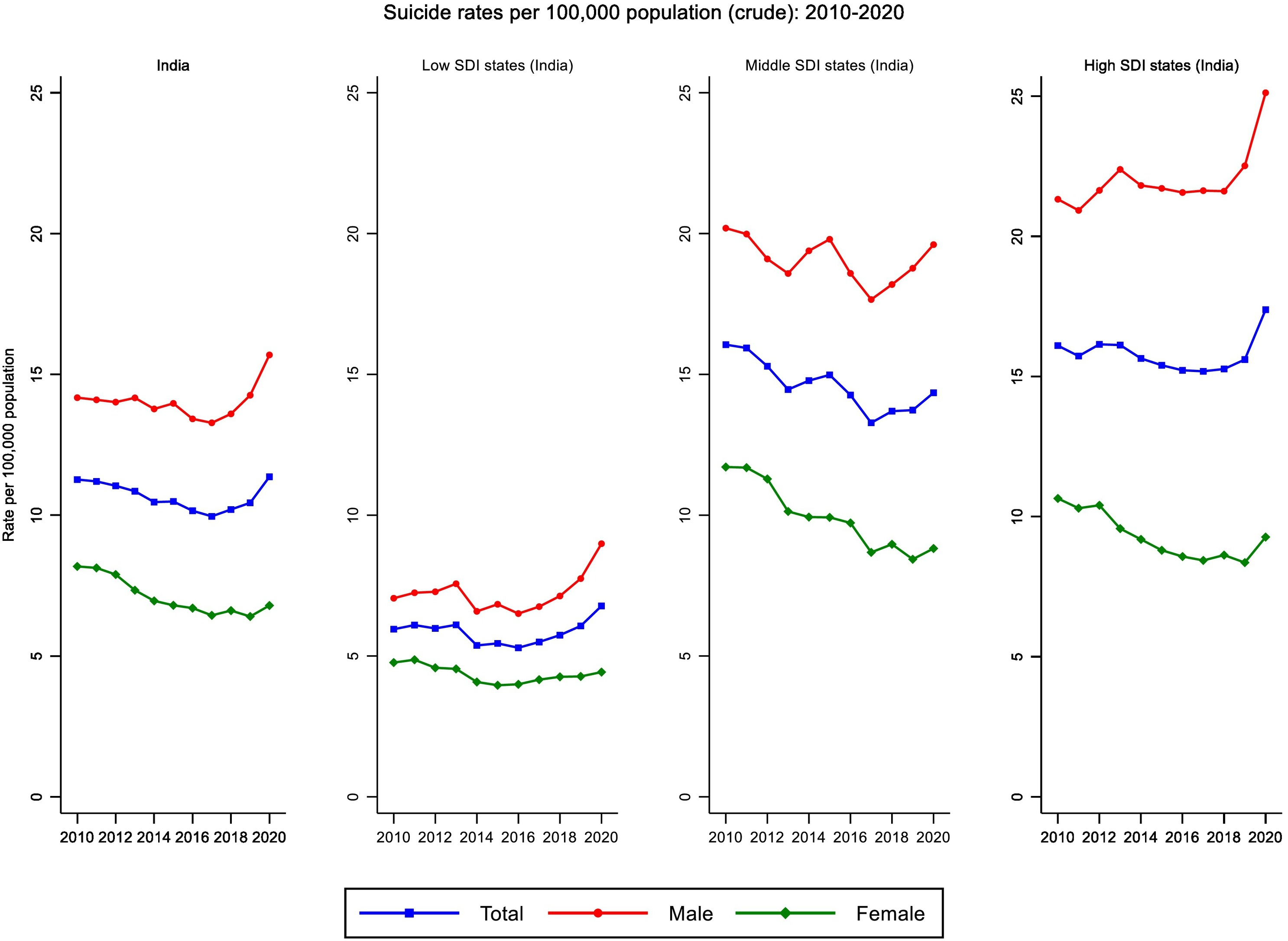
Suicide rates in India and by Socio-Demographic Index (SDI) state categories from 2010–2020. The spike in suicide rates in 2020 is visible in all the graphs. Taken from Arya et al., 2022. https://doi.org/10.1016/j.jad.2022.03.066

Regarding the Coronavirus disease (COVID-19) pandemic and suicide in India, suicide rates in India increased during the first year of the pandemic. Arya and colleagues found that "suicide rates in India generally showed a decreasing trend from 2010 until 2017, with the trend reversing after this period, particularly for males. Among males and females, the highest increase post 2017 was noted in 2020 (compared to 2017)". States with the largest increase in suicide in 2020 included Bihar, Jharkhand, Arunachal Pradesh, Uttarakhand, Punjab, and Himachal Pradesh. The increase in suicide rates were higher among males and among lower developed states. The authors suggest that this might be because of socio-economically disadvantaged populations possibly been disproportionally impacted by the effects of the pandemic in India such as loss of work and income putting strain on already disadvantaged households. However, they also mention that economic relief schemes, such as the Pradhan Mantri Garib Kalyan Yojana (PMGKY) (translated as 'Prime Minister's relief fund for the poor'), which included direct cash transfers to bank accounts and in-kind social assistance to vulnerable households might have played an important role in curtailing the increases in suicides that were observed. Also, while mental health services have increased in the past decade in India, it is possible that the mental health system in less developed parts of India was less able to be as responsive to the increased mental health burden in the community during the COVID-19 pandemic compared to settings with more resourced mental health systems. Unfortunately, mental health issues are also highly stigmatized in India, possibly contributing further to gaps in help-seeking and service provision.

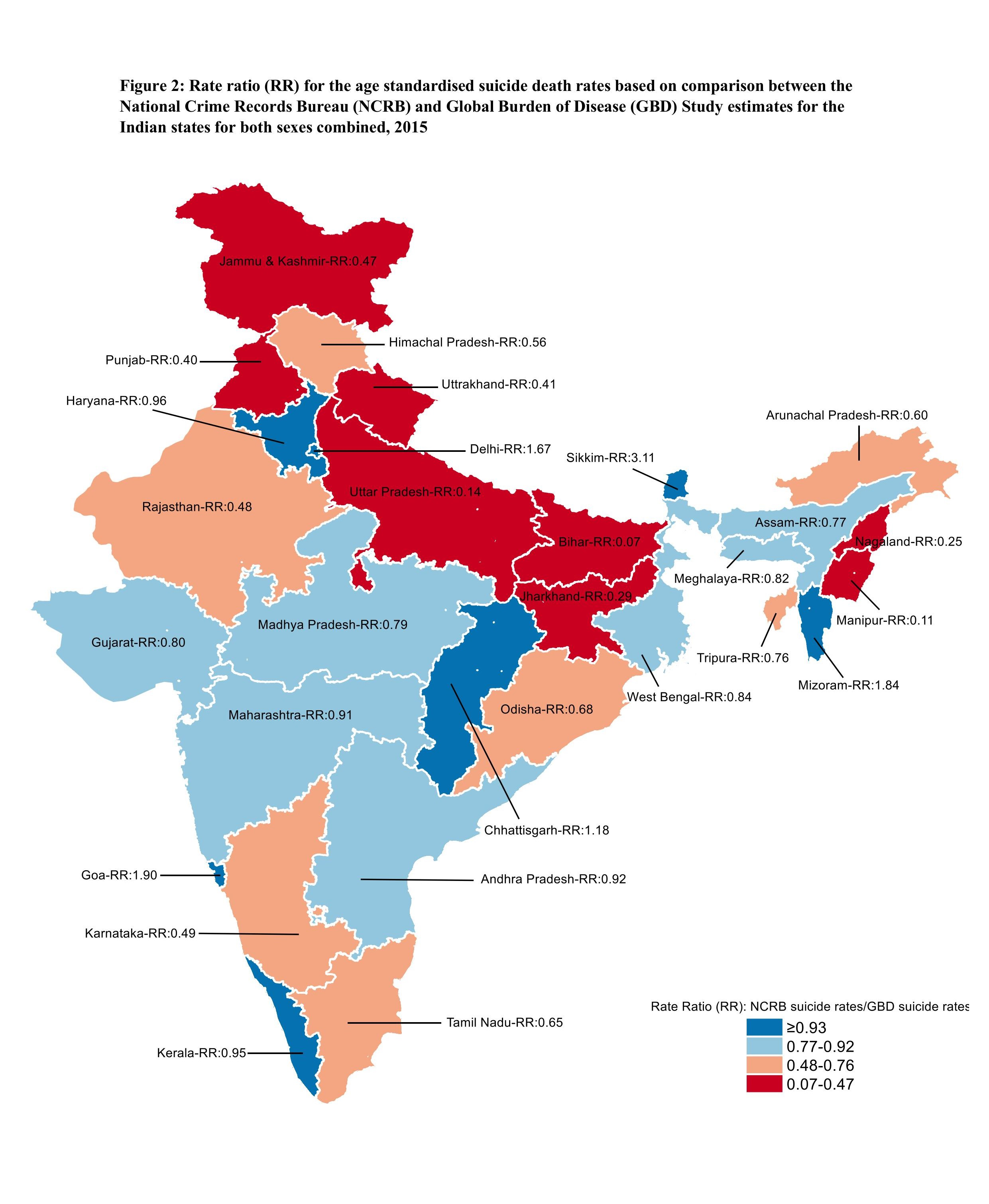
Comparison between the NCRB and GBD suicide rate estimates, 2015. States highlighted in red and orange have higher under reporting of suicide. Taken from Arya et al., 2021. https://doi.org/10.1136/jech-2020-215260

Regarding the issue of under-reporting of suicide in the NCRB data, Arya and colleagues compared the Global Burden of Disease (GBD) data with the NCRB data and found that between 2005-2015, "the GBD Study reported an additional 802 684 deaths by suicide (333 558 male and 469 126 female suicide deaths) compared with the NCRB report between 2005 and 2015. Among males, the average under-reporting was 27% (range 21%–31%) per year, and among females, the average under-reporting was 50% (range 47%–54%) per year. Under-reporting was more evident among younger (15–29 years) and older age groups (≥60 years) compared with middle age groups. Indian states belonging to low Socio-Demographic Index (SDI) generally had greater under enumeration compared with middle and high-SDI states". They highlighted that this is possibly due to lack of community-level reporting of suicides due to social stigma and legal consequences.

It is clear that suicide is an important public health issue in India and consequently, India released its first national suicide prevention strategy in November 2022. According to Arya, "the national strategy outlines various objectives, key stakeholders, and timeframes by which the objectives should ideally be achieved. The Ministry of Health and Welfare has been recognized as the key organization in ensuring the adoption of the plan at the national level, while various other ministries (e.g., the Ministry of Education, the Ministry of Social Justice and Empowerment, and the Ministry of Agriculture) and stakeholders (e.g., state and local governments, NGOs, community-level health workers, academics, and the media) are identified as key actors. It is hoped that all these various ministries and stakeholders will come together to implement the plan successfully at the national, state, and local levels. The strategy draws on the World Health Organization's (WHO) model of a multisectoral approach to suicide prevention with the goal of reducing suicide mortality by 10 % in India by 2030". He also suggests that "while the first national suicide prevention strategy of India highlights the importance of both public health and health care strategies, given the lack of resources in the health care system of India, public health strategies for suicide prevention should be prioritized including restriction of lethal means (e.g., ban on lethal pesticides), gatekeeper training and awareness programs in various different settings (e.g., schools), responsible reporting of suicide among different media platforms, and improving the quality of suicide surveillance data".

== Statistics ==
State-wise distribution in 2020

Factors contributing to suicide in India In 2019
Contributing Factors	Percentage (%)
Family problems	32.4
Illness	17.1
Drug abuse/alcohol addiction	5.6
Marriage related issues	5.5
Love affairs	4.5
Bankruptcy or indebtedness	4.2
Failure in examination	2.0
Unemployment	2.0
Professional/career problem	1.2
Property dispute	1.1
Death of dear person	0.9
Poverty	0.8
Suspected/illicit relation	0.5
Fall in social reputation	0.4
Impotency/infertility	0.3
Other causes	11.1
Causes not known	10.3

=== Regional trends ===
Among states, majority of suicides were reported in Maharashtra (22,746) followed by 19,834 in Tamil Nadu and 15,386 in Madhya Pradesh. Four states - Maharashtra, Tamil Nadu, Karnataka, West Bengal - together accounted for nearly half of the total suicides reported in the country. Nagaland reported only 41 suicides in the year. Maharashtra, Tamil Nadu, West Bengal, Madhya Pradesh and Karnataka have consistently accounted for about 8.0% (or more) suicides in India across 2017 to 2019. Among the Union Territories, Delhi reported the highest number of suicides followed by Puducherry. Lakshadweep reported zero suicides. Bihar and Punjab reported a significant increase in the percentage of suicides in 2019 over 2018.

In 2015, the top three States with highest suicide rates were Puducherry, Sikkim and Andaman and Nicobar Islands respectively, while Bihar recorded lowest suicide rates. In 2020, the top three States with highest suicide rates were Andaman and Nicobar Islands, Sikkim and Chhattisgarh respectively, while Bihar recorded lowest suicide rates.

Below is a list of States and Union Territories of India ranked according to suicide rate as on 2020. The rate is calculated as number of suicides per 1 lakh (100,000) people. The list is compiled from the 2020 Accidental Deaths and Suicides in India report published by National Crime Records Bureau (NCRB), Government of India.

Rank	State	Suicide Rate (Per 1 Lakh) 2020	Suicide Rate (per 1 Lakh) 2015
1	Sikkim	42.5	37.5
2	Chhattisgarh	26.4	27.7
3	Kerala	24.0	21.6
4	Tamil Nadu	22.2	22.8
5	Telangana	21.5	27.7
6	Tripura	20.9	19.6
7	Goa	19.9	15.4
8	Karnataka	18.4	17.4
9	Madhya Pradesh	17.4	13.3
10	Maharashtra	16.1	14.2
11	Haryana	13.7	13.0
12	West Bengal	13.4	15.7
13	Andhra Pradesh	13.4	12.1
14	Odisha	12.2	9.7
15	Gujarat	11.6	11.6
16	Himachal Pradesh	11.6	7.7
17	Arunachal Pradesh	10.5	10.4
18	Assam	9.3	10.0
19	Mizoram	8.9	11.7
20	Punjab	8.7	3.6
21	Uttarakhand	8.3	4.5
22	Rajasthan	7.2	4.8
23	Meghalaya	6.9	6.2
24	Jharkhand	5.6	2.5
25	Nagaland	2.2	0.9
26	Uttar Pradesh	2.1	2.0
27	Manipur	1.4	1.4
28	Bihar	0.7	0.5
UT1	Andaman and Nicobar Islands	45.0	28.9
UT2	Puducherry	26.3	43.2
UT3	Delhi	15.5	8.8
UT4	Dadra and Nagar Haveli and Daman and Diu	15.0	25.4
UT5	Chandigarh	10.7	6.9
UT6	Ladakh	4.0	3.0
UT7	Lakshwadeep	2.9	6.3
UT8	Jammu and Kashmir	2.2	3.0

=== Age and suicide in India ===
In 2019, the age groups 18–30 and 30–45 years accounted for 35.1% and 31.8% suicides in India, respectively. Combined, this age group of young adults accounted for 67% of total suicides. Thus, out of the total 139,000 total suicides in India, 93,061 were young adults. This indicates that they are the most vulnerable age groups. Compared to 2018, youth suicide rates have risen by 4%.

=== Literacy ===
In 2019, 12.6% victims of suicide were illiterate, 16.3% victims of suicide were educated up to primary level, 19.6% of the suicide victims were educated up to middle level and 23.3% of the suicide victims were educated up to matric level. Only 3.7% of total suicide victims were graduates and above.

=== Suicide in cities ===
The number of deaths by suicide has seen an increasing trend from 2016 to 2019. In 2019, it increased by 4.6% compared to 2018. There were 25,891 suicides reported in the largest 53 mega cities of India in 2021. In the year 2021, Delhi City(2,760) recorded the highest number of deaths by suicide among the four metropolitan cities, followed by Chennai (2,699), Bengaluru (2,292) and Mumbai (1,436). These four cities together reported almost 35.5% of the total suicides reported from the 53 mega cities.

=== Gender ===
In 2021, the male-to-female ratio of suicide victims was 72.5 : 27.4, while (70.9 : 29.1) in 2020. The total number of male suicides was 118,979 and female suicides accounted for 45,026. In the Cause-wise suicides report for 2021 published by NCRB, the only two causes where the number of female suicides were more than the number of male suicides was "marriage-related issues" (specifically "dowry-related issues") and "impotency/infertility". All other causes had more male victims than females. Male victims were the most under the cause 'Family Problems'. Of females who committed suicides, the highest number (23,178) was of house-wives followed by students (5,693) and daily wage earners (4,246). Among males, maximum suicides were by daily wage earners (37,751), followed by self-employed persons (18,803) and unemployed persons (11,724).

== Dynamics ==
=== Domestic violence ===
According to The Guardian, 36.6% of the world's total number of female suicides take place in India. Domestic violence was found to be a major risk factor for suicide in a study performed in Bangalore. In another study carried out in 2017, domestic violence was found to be a risk factor for attempted suicides among married women This is found to be reflected in the NCRB 2019 data, where the proportion of female victims were more in "marriage-related issues" (specifically in "dowry-related issues").

=== Suicide motivated by politics ===
Suicides motivated by ideology doubled between 2006 and 2008. Mental health experts say these deaths illustrate the increasing stress on young people in a nation where, elections notwithstanding, the masses often feel powerless. Sudhir Kakar was quoted to say, "The willingness to die for a cause, as exemplified by Gandhi's epic fasts during the struggle for independence, is seen as noble and worthy. Ancient warriors in Tamil Nadu, in southeastern India, would commit suicide if their commander was killed."

=== Mental illness ===
A large proportion of suicides occur in relation to psychiatric illnesses such as depression, substance use and psychosis. The association between depression and death by suicide has been found to be higher among women. The National Mental Health Survey (NMHS) 2015–16 found that almost 80% of those suffering from mental illnesses did not receive treatment for more than a year. The Indian government has been criticised by the media for its mental health care system, which is linked to the high suicide rate.

=== Farmer's suicide in India ===
The National Crime Records Bureau (NCRB) reported that in 2019, 10,281 people involved in the farming sector died by suicide. 5,957 were farmers/cultivators and 4,324 were agricultural labourers. Out of the 5,957 farmers/cultivators suicides, a total of 5,563 were male and 394 were female. Together, they accounted for 7.4% of total suicides in India in 2019.

=== Student suicides in India ===
In 2021, according to NCRB data, 13,089 students died due to suicide, an increase from 12,526 student suicides in 2020. 43.49% of these were female, while 56.51% were male. Maharashtra reported the highest number of student suicides, registering 1,834 deaths, followed by Madhya Pradesh with 1,308, and Tamil Nadu with 1,246 deaths.

At least one student commits suicide every hour in India. The year 2019 recorded the highest number of deaths by suicide (10,335) in the last 25 years. From 1995 to 2019, India lost more than 170,000 students to suicide. Despite being one of the most advanced states in India, Maharashtra had the highest number of student suicides. In 2019, Maharashtra, Tamil Nadu, Madhya Pradesh, Karnataka and Uttar Pradesh accounted for 44% of the total student suicides.

Every hour one student commits suicide in India, with about 28 such suicides reported every day, according to data compiled by the National Crime Records Bureau (NCRB). Maharashtra had the highest number of student suicides in 2018 with 1,448, followed by Tamil Nadu with 953 and Madhya Pradesh with 862. The NCRB data shows that 10,159 students committed suicide in 2018, an increase from 9,905 in 2017 and 9,478 in 2016.

A Lancet study stated that suicide death rates in India are among the highest in the world and a large proportion of adult suicide deaths occur between the ages 15 and 29.

==== Coaching centers/cram schools ====
Many suicides are attributed to the intense pressure and harsh regimen of students in cram schools (or coaching institutes). In the five years from 2011 to 2016, 57 students in Kota, dubbed the "coaching capital" of the country, died by suicide. Coaching institutes offer coaching to high school students and high school graduates for various hyper-competitive college entrance exams, most commonly the JEE or NEET. In 2023 ,26 cases of suicides were reported in Kota, Rajasthan which was one of the highest ever in history. To address these challenges, initiatives like the National Level Common Entrance Examination (NLCEE) aim to reduce the pressure faced by students. NLCEE organizes exposure visits to premier institutions like IITs and ISRO to help students make informed career decisions and reduce the uncertainty that often leads to stress and anxiety.

==== Ragging ====
Ragging has been identified as a potential trigger for suicides. Between 2012 and 2019, 54 ragging-related suicide incidents have occurred in the country.

=== Suicide in the Indian Armed Forces ===
A total of 787 suicides have been reported in the Indian Armed Forces between 2014 and 2021. Of these, the Army reported 591 suicide cases, Navy reported 36, while the Indian Air Force reported 160 deaths by suicide. More than half of the personnel in the Indian Army are under severe stress and many lives are being lost to suicides, fratricides and untoward incidents.

== Legislation ==
In India, suicide was illegal and the survivor would face jail term of up to one year and fine under Section 309 of the Indian Penal Code. However, the government of India decided to repeal the law in 2014. In April 2017, the Indian parliament decriminalised suicide by passing the Mental Healthcare Act, 2017 and the act commenced in July 2018.

=== Suicide prevention/Solution ===
Approaches to preventing suicide suggested in a 2003 monograph include:

1. Reducing social isolation
2. Preventing social disintegration
3. Treating mental disorders
4. Regulating the sale of pesticides and ropes
5. Promoting psychological motivational sessions and meditation and yoga.

State-led policies are being enforced to decrease the high suicide rate among farmers of Karnataka.

== See also ==
- List of suicide crisis lines
- Farmers' suicides in India
- Mental health in India
- List of states and union territories of India by suicide rate
- List of countries by suicide rate
- Kota, Rajasthan
