= Cox & King =

British firm

Cox & King were a British firm based in Pall Mall, London in the late 19th and early 20th centuries. They also had offices and later a shipyard in Wivenhoe, Essex. Among their many activities relating to ships such as yacht brokers, auctioneers, and builders, they were especially known for their design of luxury steam and motor yachts.

Cox & King's first naval architect, Joseph Edwin Wilkins, who worked for the firm for some 15 years, designed many of the firm's best known yachts such as Gunilda, Iolanda, Rosabelle, Venetia, and Surf.

Upon Wilkins's departure in 1908, Francis Gordon Pratt, the son of Gustavus Pratt (one of the original owners along with Sidney Depree), took over the design of motor yachts, fast launches and racing motor boats. Pratt raced a number of the latter (especially the Tyreless series) in such places as Monte Carlo as well as in the United States (Harmsworth Cup).

The demand for luxury yachts after World War I was greatly reduced due to the prevailing economic climate, and the financial crisis of the late 1920s and early 1930s, in addition to various lawsuits, led to the closure of the firm. The last Cox & King entry in Lloyd's was in 1939.

In 1913, Cox & King published a catalogue of their yachts and motor boats.
