= Gunnel Pettersson =

Swedish artist

Gunnel Pettersson, born 1960 in Malmö, is a Swedish artist who lives and works in Simrishamn and Malmö.

Gunnel Pettersson was educated as a fine artist in textiles and sculpture at University College of Arts, Crafts and Design in Stockholm (Konstfack), and also holds a degree in computer and video art from The Royal University College of Fine Arts. She has for many years played a key role in the Swedish art scene particularly in the areas of video and computer based art both as an artist, and arts organiser. Today she is a senior lecturer in film at Malmö University College and previously she was deputy head of the University College of Arts, Crafts and Design (Konstfack) in Stockholm where she also taught for many years.
Pettersson sits on the board of Filmform in Stockholm as well as for Fylkingen and for many years was active in CRAC (Creative Room for Art and Computing). As a practicing artist her works have been shown in solo exhibitions at ID: Gallery in Stockholm (2004), Chiangmai University Art Museum in Thailand (1998) and Overgaden in Copenhagen (1992).
