= Gunhild Nygaard =

Norwegian fashion designer (born 1965)

- Born: February 22, 1965 (age 61); Oslo, Norway
- Education: Esmod in Paris
- Labels: Gunhild; kaneles
- Parent(s): Nils Nygaard, Jofrid Nygaard
- Awards: Créateur de l'Année, Paris, 2009

Gunhild Nygaard (born February 22, 1965) is a Norwegian fashion designer.

== Early life ==
She has her education from the Esmod fashion school in Paris, France.

Since 1990, she has lived in Paris and has previously worked as designer at both Givenchy and Christian Dior. In 2007, she presented her first solo collection Gunhild, and received the award Créateur de l'Année from the mayor of Paris in 2009.

In 2020, she launched the brand kaneles. The brand name originates from her nickname during childhood.
