= De sotarna! De sotarna! =

1990 novel by Lars Ahlin

- First edition
- Author: Lars Ahlin
- Language: Swedish
- Published: 1990
- Publisher: Albert Bonniers Förlag
- Publication place: Sweden
- Awards: August Prize of 1990

De sotarna! De sotarna! (lit. The Chimney Sweepers! The Chimney Sweepers!) is a 1990 novel by Swedish author Lars Ahlin. It won the August Prize in 1990.
