= Lars Ahlin =

Swedish author and aesthetician

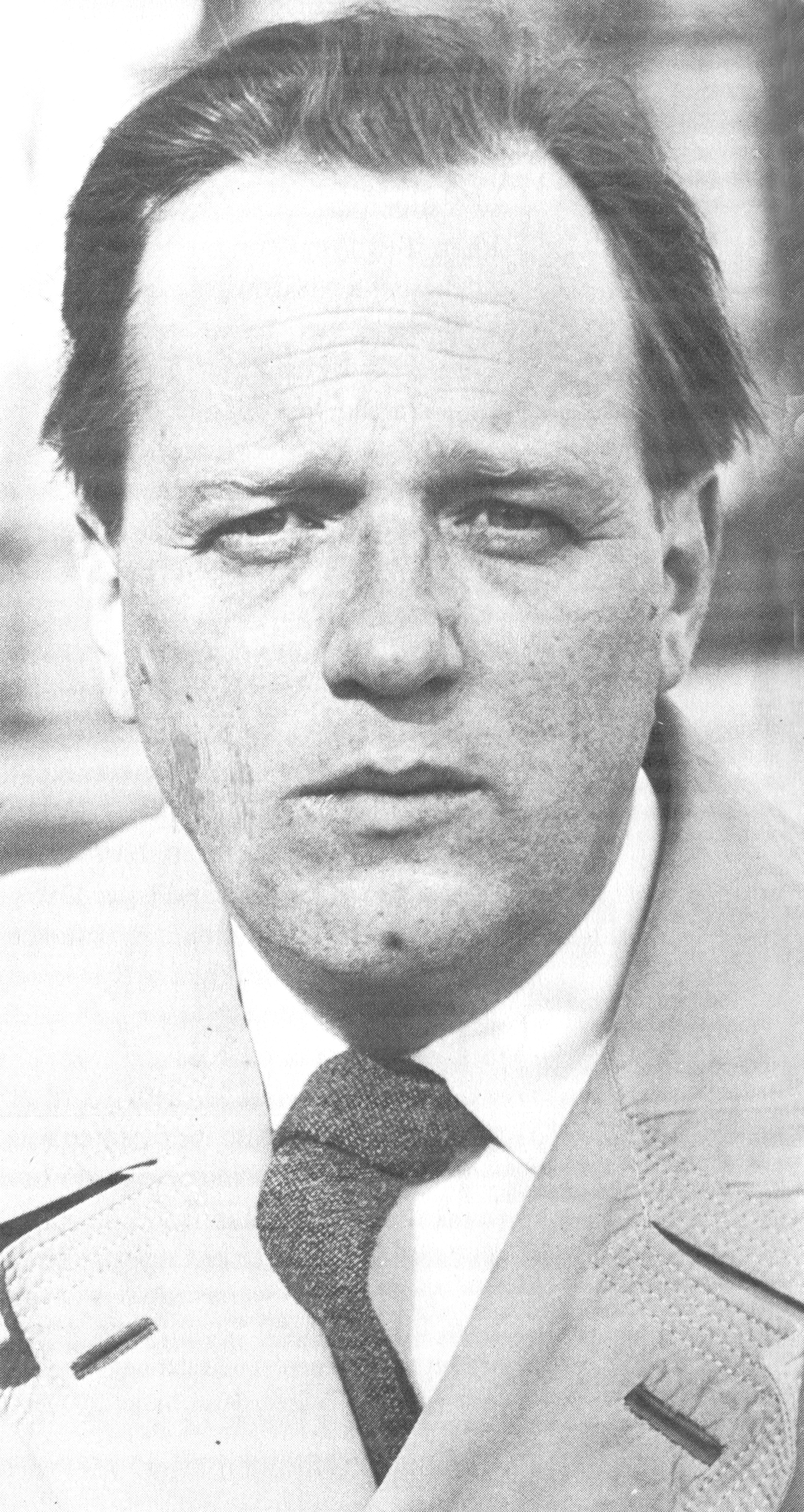
Lars Ahlin

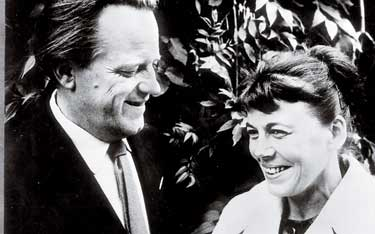
Lars Ahlin with his wife Gunnel, 1960.

Lars Ahlin (4 April 1915 – 11 March 1997) was a Swedish author and aesthetician.

== Biography ==
Ahlin left school when he was 13 to support his family, although he later attended several folk high schools. When he was 18, he had a mystical experience. He eventually moved to Stockholm, where he wrote two unpublished novels before his first success, Tåbb med manifestet (Tåbb with the Manifesto, 1943). The story, about a young proletarian who rejects the values of communism in favor of a secularized Lutheran theology where man is judged by his deeds, without preconceived notions, set the stage for his subsequent works. Critics have compared Ahlin to Fyodor Dostoyevsky and Thomas Mann. Among the awards he received are the Prize of the Nine in 1960, the Great Novel Prize in 1962, and the Small Nobel Prize in 1966. In 1995, he won the Swedish Academy Nordic Prize, known as the 'little Nobel'.

== Notable works ==
- Tåbb med manifestet, 1943
- No Eyes Await Me (story collection), 1944
- Min död är min (My Death Is My Own), 1945
- Om (If, About, Around), 1946
- Kanelbiten (The Cinnamon Girl), 1953
- The Great Amnesia, 1954
- Natt i marknadstältet (Night in the Market Tent), 1957
- Bark and Leaves, 1961
- Sjätte munnen (The Sixth Mouth), 1985
- De sotarna! De sotarna! (The Chimney Sweepers! The Chimney Sweepers!), 1991
