= Gunnel =

Gunnel may refer to:

- Gunnel (given name), Swedish feminine given name
- Gunnel (fish), a family of elongated fish
- Gunnel (ship element), also known as "gunwale", the top edge of the side of a boat
- USS Gunnel (SS-253), a Gato-class submarine
- Gunnel Channel, Antarctica
