= Gunnel Ahlin =

Swedish writer

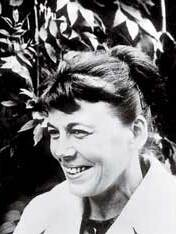
Ahlin in 1960

Gunnel Maria Ahlin (née Hellman, Orsa församling, Dalarna, 1 June 1918 – Stockholm, 7 January 2007) was a Swedish writer and teacher.

Her parents were the rector Johannes Hellman and his wife Aina Albihn. She married Lars Ahlin in 1946, and they had a son, the astronomer Per Ahlin. Gunnel Ahlin debuted in 1960 with the novel Voices one summer and made his breakthrough in 1974 with the historical novel Hannibal Son.

== Works ==
- Röster en sommar, 1960
- Här dansar, 1962
- Puls, 1964
- Refuge, 1967
- Hannibal sonen, 1974
- Hannibal segraren, 1982
- Lars Ahlin växer upp, 2001
- Nu ska vi ta pulsen på världen, 2005

== Awards ==
- 1982 – Kellgrenpriset
- 1983 – Aniarapriset
- 2001 – De Nios Vinterpris
- 2002 – Birger Schöldströms pris
