= Gunnel Carlson =

Swedish writer (born 1956)

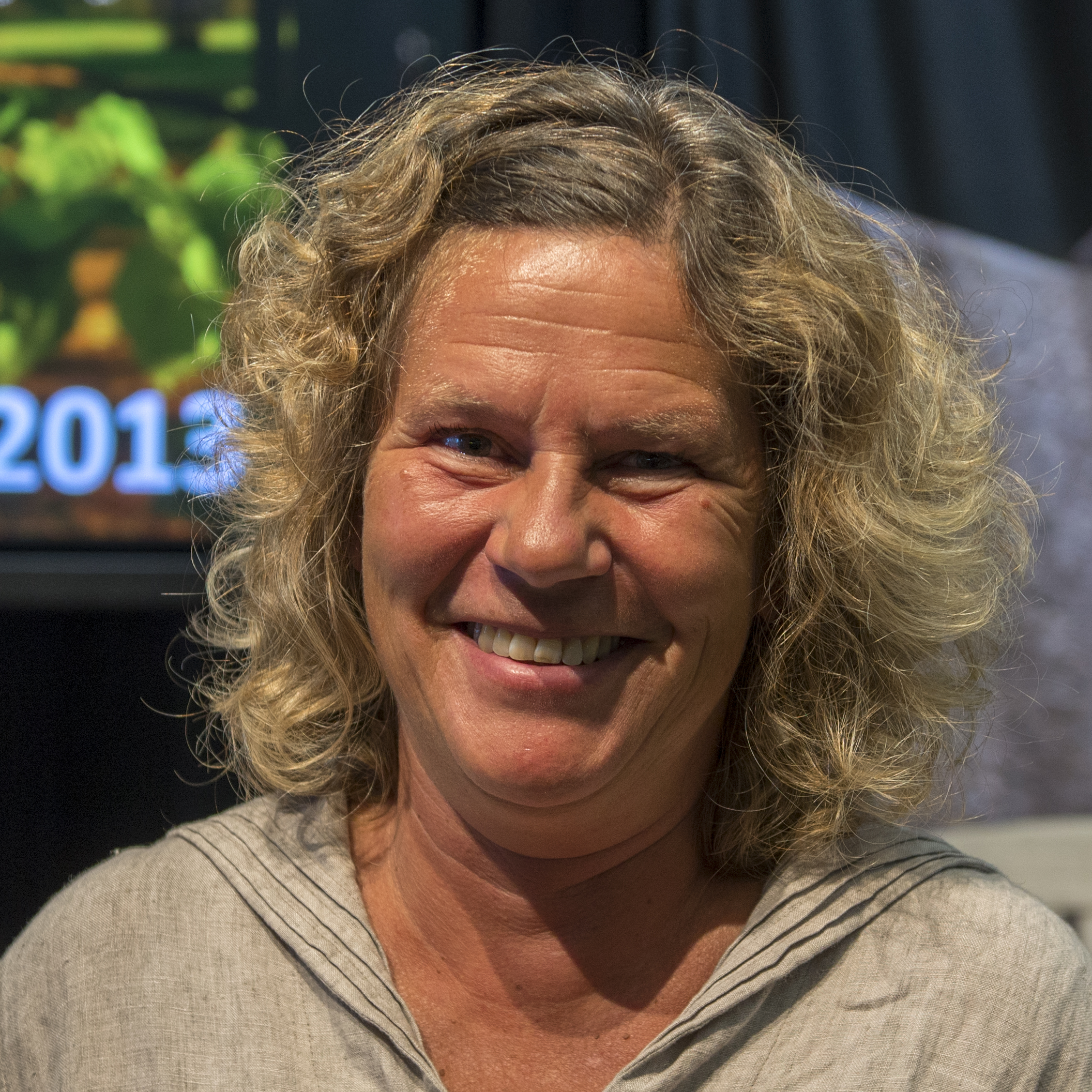
- Carlson in 2013
- Born: 25 November 1956 (age 69); Asarum, Sweden
- Occupations: Author, journalist, television presenter

Gunnel Jennie Ann Carlson (née Persson; born 25 November 1956) is a Swedish garden-topic journalist, author and television presenter. She is known for presenting the SVT gardening show Gröna rum. She is also an author of several books, and is a regular at the SVT show Go'kväll.

Gunnel Persson was born in Asarum, Blekinge County, Sweden.

== Bibliography ==
- Carlson, Gunnel (2000). Gröna rum. Stockholm: Prisma. Libris 7408813. ISBN 91-518-3802-8
- Carlson, Gunnel; Hultin Susanna, Ljung Victoria, Magnusson Gunnar, Gustavsson Lars-Åke, Wedblad Johan (2003). Gröna hjälpen: 106 frågor och svar om växter ute och inne. Stockholm: Prisma. Libris 8872387. ISBN 91-518-4173-8
- Växter för balkong & uterum: [blommande växter, grönsaker, sydfrukter, kryddor, inredningstips]. Sundbyberg: Semic. 2004. Libris 9426147. ISBN 91-552-3166-7
- Växthus & uterum: [praktiska råd, blommor, grönsaker, sydfrukter, kryddor, inredningsförslag]. Sundbyberg: Semic. 2006. Libris 10025719. ISBN 91-552-3315-5
- Carlson Gunnel, red (2007). Trädgårdsguiden: om konsten att hitta smultronställen i trädgårdssverige : en underbar resa bland Sveriges öppna trädgårdar från söder till norr. Malmö: Arena. Libris 10367664. ISBN 978-91-7843-234-9
- Hultin, Susanna; Carlson Gunnel, Persson Görgen (2008). Skydda trädgården från rådjur, sniglar, bladlöss och andra skadedjur. Sundbyberg: Semic. Libris 10642893. ISBN 978-91-552-3607-6
- Hultin, Susanna; Carlson Gunnel, Persson Görgen (2009). Rensa trädgården: från kirskål, kvickrot, maskrosor, tistlar och annat ogräs. Sundbyberg: Semic. Libris 11204821. ISBN 978-91-552-5435-3
- Carlson, Gunnel; Magnusson Gunnar (2009). Vackert i vasen. Kosta: Kosta förlag. Libris 11446868. ISBN 978-91-977647-1-1
- Arvidsson, Gösta; Carlson Gunnel, Yeh Tomas (2010). Lust till livet. Göteborg: Tre stiftelser. Libris 11856587. ISBN 978-91-633-6361-0
- Hultin, Susanna; Carlson Gunnel, Persson Görgen (2010). Första trädgårdshjälpen: vanliga frågor & oumbärliga svar. Sundbyberg: Semic. Libris 11654061. ISBN 978-91-552-5556-5
- Hultin, Susanna; Carlson Gunnel, Persson Görgen (2011). Största trädgårdshjälpen: om ogräs och skadedjur. Sundbyberg: Semic. Libris 11974329. ISBN 978-91-552-5675-3
- Carlson Gunnel, red (2011). Trädgårdsriket: guide till 850 svenska trädgårdar. Stockholm: Norstedt. Libris 12087272. ISBN 978-91-1-303713-4
- Kewenter, Ewa; Carlson Gunnel, Turander Ralf, Yeh Tomas (2012). Gunnebo: historien, hantverket, trädgårdarna, maten. Malmö: Arena. Libris 12442554. ISBN 978-91-7843-373-5
- Carlson, Gunnel; Bergdahl Pernilla (2012). Min gröna passion. Stockholm: Norstedts. Libris 12346040. ISBN 978-91-1-303643-4
