= Edna Mary Gunnell =

British gardener

- Citizenship: British
- Occupations: Horticulturist, lecturer
- Employer(s): Key Gardens, Devon County Council, Women's Institute

Edna Mary Gunnell (1879–1963) was one of the first women gardeners trained at Kew Gardens in professional horticulture. Gunnell went on to become the first female county council horticultural superintendent in the United Kingdom when she was appointed superintendent in Devon County Council in 1920.

== Biography ==
Gunnell was born into a middle class family and completed her studies at Salt School in Shipley. Gunnell undertook a Certificate in Horticulture at the University College of Reading, which ran a women only horticulture course. She then applied to Kew and moved there in 1900 where she studied until 1901. Following her graduation, Gunnell was employed in 1902 teaching ladies horticulture at the private school Aberglaskyn in Torquay. She went on to teach at St Petrox School, Paington where she remained for the following 2 years teaching horticulture.

In 1907 Gunnell then travelled and lived in Europe where she began teaching in Silesia and subsequently employed in a variety of posts in Germany. In 1914, she wrote an account of her work and experiences in the Kew Guild where she describes her employment, interests and the integration of women and men in horticultural training. Gunnell reported that her most interesting post was in 1912 when she was the co-principal of the School of Horticulture for Women at Godesburg-am Rhine.

Back in England, she gave postal horticultural tuition in 1914, working as lecturer at Swanley College of Horticulture for a year. In 1915, Gunnell then went to the United States where she spent most of World War I employed as head of Floriculture at Ambler, the Pennsylvania School of Horticulture for Women.

In 1920 Gunnell was appointed as Horticultural Superintendent for Devon County Council, the first female to be appointed to this role by any council in the United Kingdom. While in Devon, she promoted horticultural knowledge including jam making, growing vegetables and preserving to the Devon Federation of Women Institutes.

Gunnell was appointed an Officer of the Order of the British Empire in 1945.

Gunnell died on February 16, 1963.
