= Gunhild (clothing) =

French clothing company

gunhild
- Company type: Private
- Industry: Fashion
- Founded: Paris, France (2007)
- Headquarters: Paris, France
- Key people: Gunhild Nygaard
- Products: Clothing
- Website: gunhild

Gunhild (stylized gunhild), is a French clothing company, known for its fashion clothing offerings for women. Gunhild is based in Paris, France, and was established in Paris in 2007 by the Norwegian designer Gunhild Nygaard. The collection of 2009 was awarded with the Créateur de l'Année from the Mayor of Paris, France.

The Gunhild collections are both designed and produced in France. The collections are primarily sold in France but are also exported to other countries, such as Canada, Japan, Italy, China, Turkey, and Norway.
