= William Gunnell House =

William Gunnell House may refer to

- William Gunnell House (Fairfax, Virginia), a contributing property of the City of Fairfax Historic District in the National Register of Historic Places listings in Fairfax City, Virginia
- William Gunnell House (Great Falls, Virginia), listed in the National Register of Historic Places listings in Fairfax County, Virginia
