= 891 Gunhild =

Main-belt asteroid

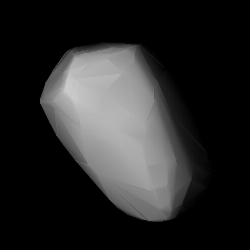
- Modelled shape of Gunhild from its lightcurve

Discovery
- Discovered by: M. F. Wolf
- Discovery site: Heidelberg Obs.
- Discovery date: 17 May 1918

Designations
- Named after: unknown
- Alternative designations: A918 KB · 1977 FH; 1999 CF_{154} · A915 VE; 1918 DQ · 1915 VE
- Minor planet category: main-belt · (outer) background

Orbital characteristics
- Epoch 31 May 2020 (JD 2459000.5)
- Uncertainty parameter 0
- Observation arc: 101.70 yr (37,145 d)
- Aphelion: 2.9444 AU
- Perihelion: 2.7799 AU
- Semi-major axis: 2.8622 AU
- Eccentricity: 0.0287
- Orbital period (sidereal): 4.84 yr (1,769 d)
- Mean anomaly: 232.57°
- Mean motion: 0° 12^{m} 12.6^{s} / day
- Inclination: 13.559°
- Longitude of ascending node: 105.85°
- Argument of perihelion: 292.38°

Physical characteristics
- Mean diameter: 51.95±5.6 km; 55.747±0.321 km; 63.80±0.67 km
- Synodic rotation period: 11.892±0.001 h
- Geometric albedo: 0.049±0.001; 0.057±0.019; 0.0718±0.018
- Spectral type: D (S3OS2-TH); T (S3OS2-BB); D (SDSS-MOC)
- Absolute magnitude (H): 10.0

891 Gunhild (prov. designation: A918 KB or 1918 DQ) is a large background asteroid from the outer regions of the asteroid belt, that measures approximately 58 kilometers (36 miles) in diameter. It was discovered on 17 May 1918, by astronomer Max Wolf at the Heidelberg-Königstuhl State Observatory in southwest Germany. The dark D-type asteroid has a rotation period of 11.9 hours. Any reference of the asteroid's name to a person is unknown.

== Orbit and classification ==
Gunhild is a non-family asteroid of the main belt's background population when applying the hierarchical clustering method to its proper orbital elements. It orbits the Sun in the outer asteroid belt at a distance of 2.8–2.9 AU once every 4 years and 10 months (1,769 days; semi-major axis of 2.86 AU). Its orbit has an eccentricity of 0.03 and an inclination of 14° with respect to the ecliptic. The asteroid was first observed as A915 VE (1915 VE) at Simeiz Observatory in November 1915. The body's observation arc begins at Heidelberg Observatory on 18 May 1918, the night after its official discovery observation.

== Naming ==
This minor planet is named after a Feminine German first name. Any reference of this name to a person or occurrence is unknown.

=== Unknown meaning ===
Among the many thousands of named minor planets, Gunhild is one of 120 asteroids, for which no official naming citation has been published. All of these low-numbered asteroids have numbers between 164 Eva and 1514 Ricouxa and were discovered between 1876 and the 1930s, predominantly by astronomers Auguste Charlois, Johann Palisa, Max Wolf and Karl Reinmuth.

== Physical characteristics ==
In both the Tholen- and SMASS-like taxonomy of the Small Solar System Objects Spectroscopic Survey (S3OS2), as well as in the SDSS-based taxonomy, Gunhild is a dark D-type asteroid. This asteroid spectral type is common among outer belt asteroids and very common among the Jupiter trojan population.

=== Rotation period ===
In July 2015, a rotational lightcurve of Gunhild was obtained from photometric observations by the Spanish group of asteroid observers, OBAS. Lightcurve analysis gave a rotation period of 11.892±0.001 hours with a brightness amplitude of 0.36±0.02 magnitude (U=3−). The result supersedes period determinations of (7.93±0.01 h) by Robert Stephens in 2000, (11.853±0.006 h) by Laurent Bernasconi in 2005, and (10.556±0.003 h) by Janus Kozdon in 2015 (U=2/2/2+).

=== Diameter and albedo ===
According to the survey carried out by the Infrared Astronomical Satellite IRAS, the Japanese Akari satellite, and the NEOWISE mission of NASA's Wide-field Infrared Survey Explorer (WISE), Gunhild measures (51.95±5.6), (55.747±0.321) and (63.80±0.67) kilometers in diameter and its surface has an albedo of (0.0718±0.018), (0.057±0.019) and (0.049±0.001), respectively. The Collaborative Asteroid Lightcurve Link derives an albedo of 0.0656 and a diameter of 51.89 kilometers based on an absolute magnitude of 10.0. Alternative mean-diameter measurements published by the WISE team include (51.05±8.60 km), (58.064±1.384 km) and (65.12±15.84 km) with corresponding albedos of (0.07±0.04), (0.0574±0.0017) and (0.05±0.02). Several asteroid occultation observed between 2010 and 2014 gave a best-fit ellipse dimension of 52.0 × 52.0 kilometers (one observation) and 63.0 × 63.0 kilometers (three observations). These timed observations are taken when the asteroid passes in front of a distant star.
