= David Gunnell =

English epidemiologist

David Gunnell CBE FMedSci
- Education: University of Bristol
- Known for: Research on suicide prevention
- Awards: Research Award from the American Foundation for Suicide Prevention (2015)
- Scientific career
- Workplaces: University of Bristol
- Thesis: Food, death and income - a follow-up study based on a survey of family diet and health in pre-war Britain (1937-9). (1996)

David John Gunnell CBE FMedSci is an English epidemiologist and public health physician who is Professor of Epidemiology at the University of Bristol. He was elected a Fellow of the Academy of Medical Sciences in 2014 and a Fellow of the Faculty of Public Health in 1999. David's research has focused on adult mental health, suicide prevention and life course influences on mental well-being. In 2026, David was awarded a CBE in the King's Birthday Honours List for his services to public health and suicide prevention.

Early life and education

David was born in Epsom, Surrey on 17 November 1960. The eldest son of a Schoolmaster at Epsom College and a Westminster Hospital trained children's nurse who worked in England and Canada. After A levels, he trained as a medical doctor at the University of Bristol where he received his MBChB in 1984.

Career and research

David completed his general practice training but it was his increasing interest in public health medicine that led him to embark on a career as an epidemiologist and public health physician. In 1993, he was awarded a lectureship at the University of Bristol. He completed his PhD in life course epidemiology “Food, death and income - a follow-up study based on a survey of family diet and health in pre-war Britain (1937-9)” in 1996. He received an MSc in Medical Statistics with Distinction at the London School of Hygiene and Tropical Medicine (LHSTM) in 1997. He was promoted to a personal chair at the University of Bristol in 2003. He was awarded a Doctor of Science (DSc) in 2009 and was a National Institute for Health and Care Research (NIHR) Senior Investigator from 2007 to 2015.

David's work has helped shape national and international suicide prevention strategies. He has been an invited member on the World Health Organization (WHO) suicide prevention strategy groups and worked with leading organisations including the Samaritans. During the Covid-19 pandemic, David led the International COVID-19 Suicide Prevention Research Collaboration. This was an international group of researchers brought together from around 30 countries to understand how the pandemic and the associated public health measures affected suicide risk.

David has published over 580 peer-reviewed papers. His work has been cited over 150,000 times and his H-index is 161. He has been identified by Clarivate as being amongst the most Highly Cited Researchers in his field for 8 consecutive years (2018-2025).

Recognition/awards

David received the American Foundation for Suicide Prevention's Research Award in 2015 and in the same year the International Association for Suicide Prevention’s Erwin Stengel Research Award for outstanding research in the field of suicide prevention. In 2025, he was awarded the Morselli Medal by the International Academy for Suicide Research (IASR) for "outstanding and enduring achievements in the science and art of suicide prevention" [awaiting IASR website update]. In 2026, David was awarded a Commander of the Most Excellent Order of the British Empire (CBE) in the King’s Birthday Honours for his services to public health and suicide prevention.
