= Filmform =

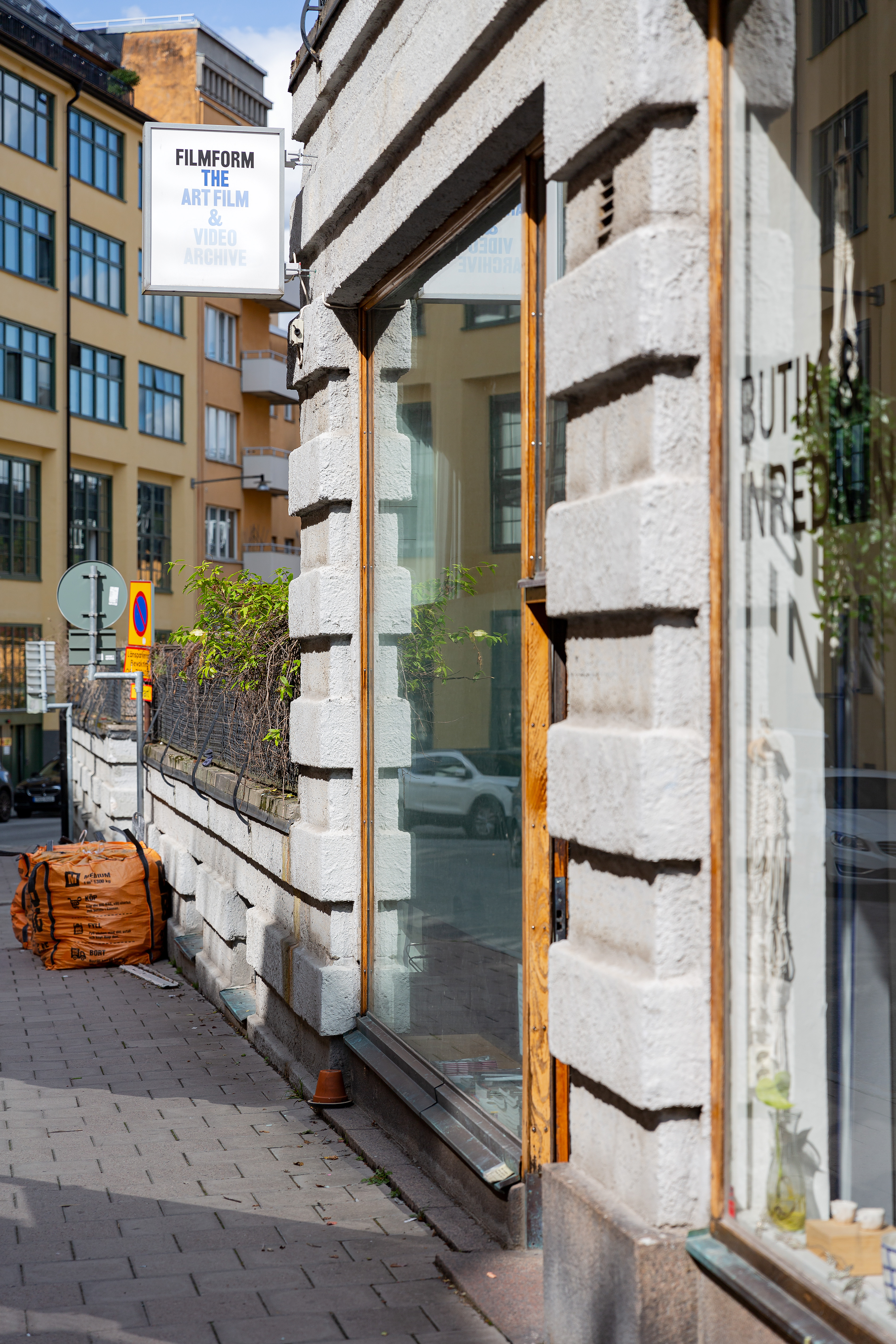
Filmform (Stockholm)

Filmform is a Swedish foundation dedicated to promotion, distribution and preservation of Swedish art film and experimental video. Founded in 1950, it was originally known as Svensk Experimentfilmstudio and was later called Arbetsgruppen för Film (AFF). The Filmform collection includes 1,200 titles from 1924 until today. Filmform is supported by the Arts Grants Committee of the Ministry of Culture and the Swedish Arts Council.

On 31 October 2020, Filmform organized a screening in Stockholm to reconstruct the original screening 70 years prior at the National Museum.
