= Lavoie =

Lavoie is a surname of French origin. The meaning of la voie is "the way". The Lavoie name dates to the year 900, during the first Viking invasions, relating to nobles living close to a road. The name has remained throughout France and Canada.

== People with Lavoie as surname ==
- Alexandre Lavoie (born 1992), Canadian ice hockey player
- Cheryl Lavoie, politician in New Brunswick, Canada
- Claude Lavoie Richer (1929–2014), Canadian cross-country skier
- Daniel Lavoie (born 1949), Canadian
- Dominic Lavoie (born 1967), Canadian-born Austrian former professional ice hockey player
- Djane Lavoie-Herz (1889–1982), Canadian pianist and teacher
- Don Lavoie (1951–2001), American economist
- Donald Lavoie (born 1942), self-proclaimed former hit man for the Dubois Gang organized crime group
- Elyse Lemay-Lavoie (born 1994), Canadian water polo player
- Émilie Lavoie (born 2001), Canadian ice hockey player
- Francis T. Lavoie (1874–1947), Canadian politician
- François Lavoie (born 1993), Canadian ten-pin bowler
- Frédérick Lavoie, Canadian writer and journalist
- Gilbert R. Lavoie, medical doctor and non-fiction writer
- Jacques Lavoie (1936–2000), politician and member of the House of Commons of Canada
- Jean-Noël Lavoie (1927–2013), notary and former political figure in Quebec, Canada
- Kari Lavoie (born 1977), Canadian curler.
- Kathleen Lavoie (1949–2022), American microbiologist and explorer
- Louis Lavoie (1905–1947), Canadian boxer.
- Raphaël Lavoie (born 2000), Canadian professional ice hockey player.
- Roland Kent LaVoie (born 1943), musician with stage name Lobo
- Marc Lavoie (born 1954), Canadian professor of economics
- Marie-Renée Lavoie (born 1974), Canadian writer
- Mathieu Lavoie, Canadian politician in Quebec
- Omer Lavoie, senior officer in the Canadian Army
- Patrick Lavoie (born 1987), Canadian football fullback
- René Lavoie (1921–2000), Canadian politician
- Simon Lavoie (born 1979), Canadian film director and screenwriter
- Steeve Lavoie, Canadian politician
- Thérèse Lavoie-Roux (1928–2009), Canadian politician

== People with Lavoie as middle name ==
- Claude Lavoie Richer (1929–2014), Canadian cross-country skier

== Court cases ==
- Lavoie v. Canada, a 2002 court case of the Supreme Court of Canada

== Alternative spellings ==
- LaVoie (US)
- La Voie
- Lavoye
- Lavoy
- DeLavoye (US)
- Leavoy (US)
- LeVoy (US)
- LaVoy

== See also ==
- La Voix (disambiguation)
- La Voz (disambiguation)
- The Voice (disambiguation)
