= Sectoral balances =

Sectoral analysis framework

The sectoral balances (also called sectoral financial balances) are a sectoral analysis framework for macroeconomic analysis of national economies developed by British economist Wynne Godley.

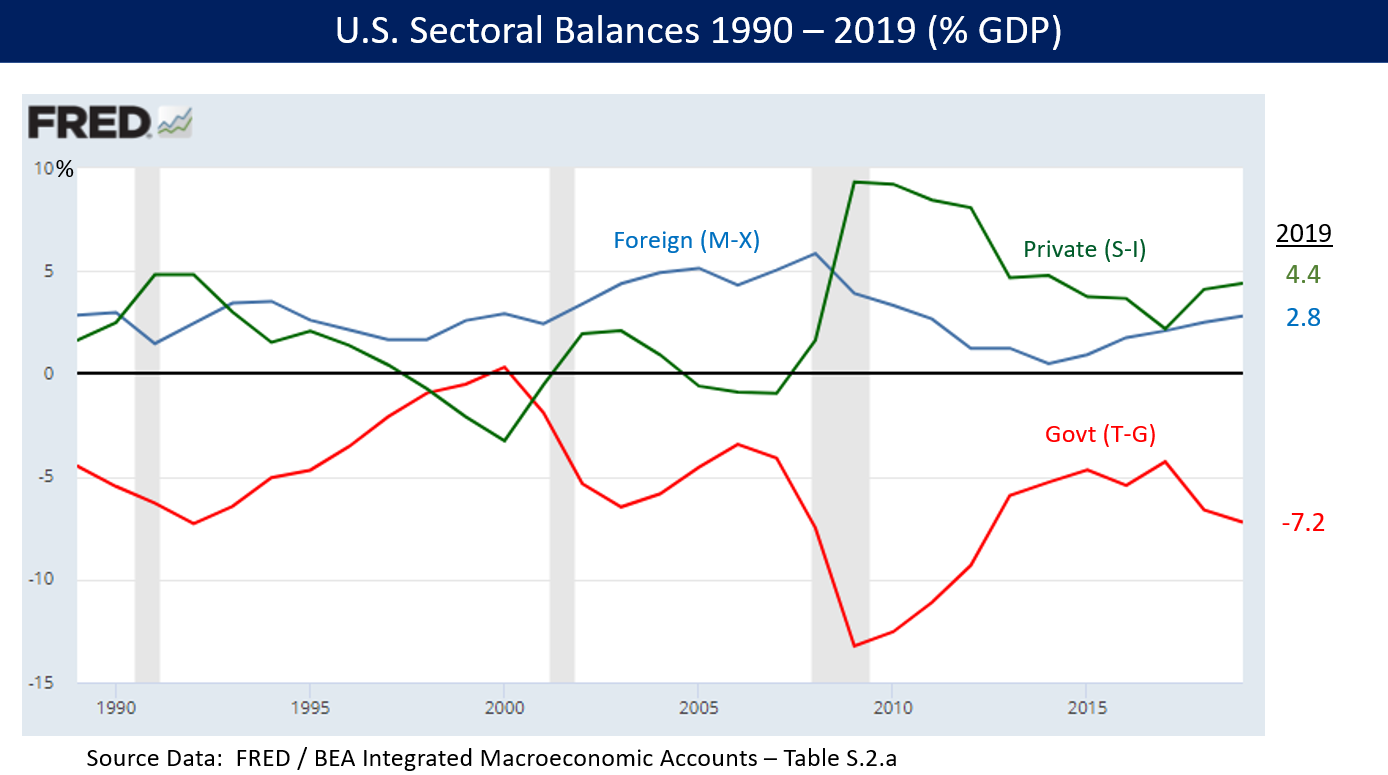
Sectoral financial balances in U.S. economy 1990-2019. By definition, the three balances must net to zero. Since 2008, the foreign sector surplus and private sector surplus have been offset by a government budget deficit.

Sectoral analysis is based on the insight that when the government sector has a budget deficit, the non-government sectors (private domestic sector and foreign sector) together must have a surplus, and vice versa. The balances represent an accounting identity resulting from rearranging the components of aggregate demand, showing how the flow of funds affects the financial balances of the three sectors.

This corresponds approximately to Balances Mechanics developed by Wolfgang Stützel in the 1950s. The approach is used by scholars at the Levy Economics Institute to support macroeconomic modelling and by Modern Monetary Theorists to illustrate the relationship between government budget deficits and private saving.

== Overview ==
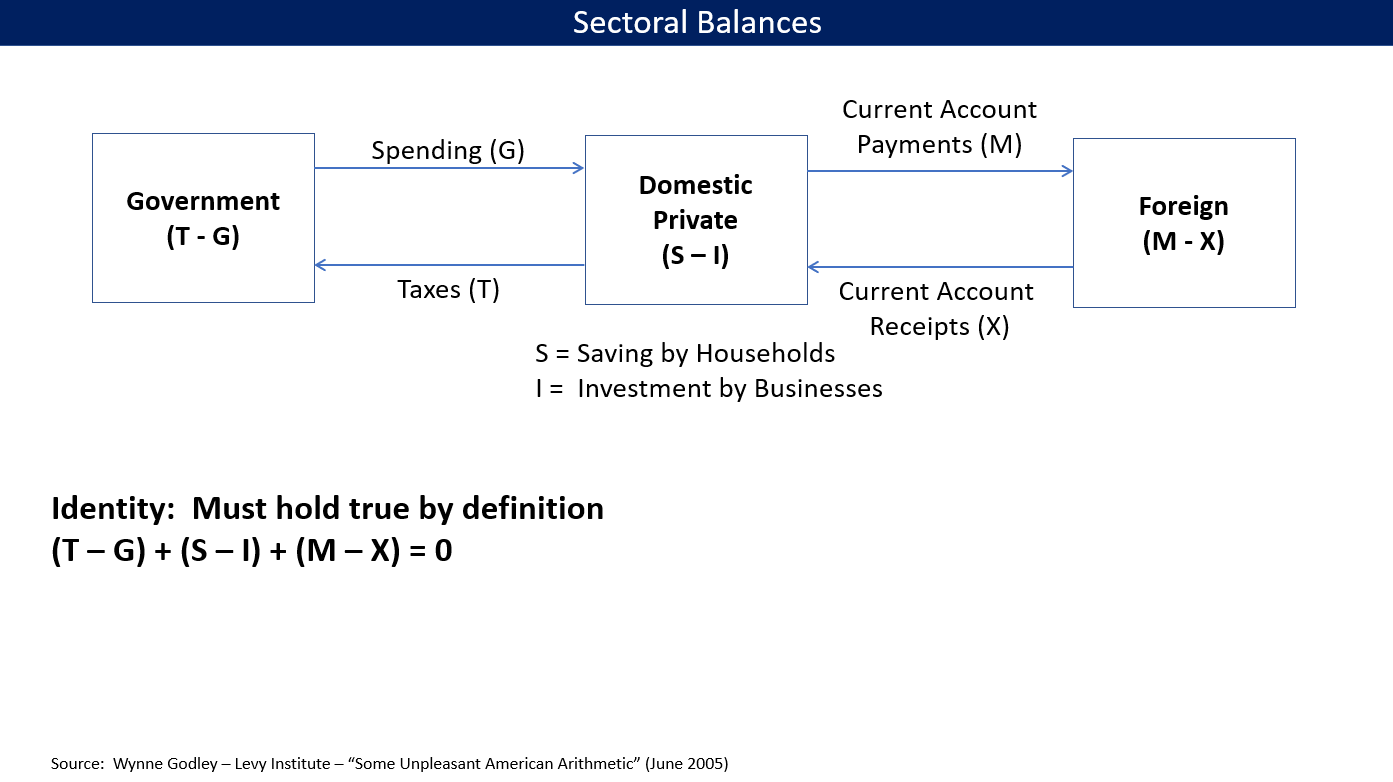
Illustration of the saving identity with the three sectors, the computation of the surplus or deficit balances for each, and the flows between them.

The government fiscal balance is one of three major financial sectoral balances in the national economy, the others being the foreign financial sector and the private financial sector. The sum of the surpluses or deficits across these three sectors must be zero by definition. A surplus balance represents a net savings or net financial asset building position (i.e., more money is flowing into the sector than is flowing out), while a deficit balance represents a net borrowing or net financial asset reducing position (i.e., more money is flowing out of the sector than is flowing into it). Each sector may be defined as follows, using the U.S. as an example:

- Private sector: A surplus balance means U.S. households and businesses together are net savers, building their financial asset position. In other words, savings by households exceed the amount borrowed and invested by businesses. There is a net inflow of money into the private sector. The private sector had a 4.4% GDP surplus in 2019. A deficit would mean households and businesses together are net borrowers, reducing their financial asset position.
- Foreign sector or "rest of the world": A surplus balance means those outside the U.S. are net savers. This is consistent with a U.S. current account or trade deficit, in which U.S. residents borrow savings from foreign residents to finance import purchases. Foreigners are building their net financial asset position by lending to the U.S. so it can purchase their imports. More money is flowing from the U.S. private and government sectors to the foreign sector than the reverse. The U.S. had a current account deficit of 2.8% GDP in 2019, meaning the foreign sector had a 2.8% GDP surplus; think of this balance from the foreign perspective. A foreign sector deficit balance would mean foreign residents are net spenders and are borrowing from the U.S. private sector, which would be consistent with a U.S. current account or trade surplus; this was not the 2018 situation. The current account includes the trade balance plus payments for investment income (dividends and interest).
- Government balance (all levels, e.g., federal, state and local in the U.S.): A surplus balance represents a government collecting more tax revenue than it pays in outlays, building its net financial asset position. This would mean the government is a net saver, removing funds from the private sector. A deficit balance means government outlays are greater than tax revenue and it is reducing its net financial asset position (i.e., increasing its debt position), providing funds to the private sector. Another interpretation is that a government surplus reduces private sector financial assets, while a government deficit increases private sector financial assets. The U.S. government at all levels ran a 7.2% GDP deficit in 2019.

To summarize, in the U.S. in 2019, there was a private sector surplus of 4.4% GDP due to household savings exceeding business investment. There was also a current account deficit of 2.8% GDP, meaning the foreign sector was in surplus. By definition, there must therefore exist a government budget deficit of 7.2% GDP so all three net to zero. For comparison, the U.S. government budget deficit in 2011 was approximately 10% GDP (8.6% GDP of which was federal), offsetting a foreign sector surplus of 4% GDP and a private sector surplus of 6% GDP.

Godley wrote in 2005 that: "[T]he deficit of the general government (federal, state, and local) is everywhere and always equal (by definition) to the current account deficit plus the private sector balance (the excess of private saving over investment)." Expressed as a formula, the sectoral balance identity is: (Savings - Investment) + (Imports - Exports) + (Tax Revenues - Outlays) = 0; or (S-I) + (M-X) + (T-G) =0, as described below.

== Recent interpretations ==
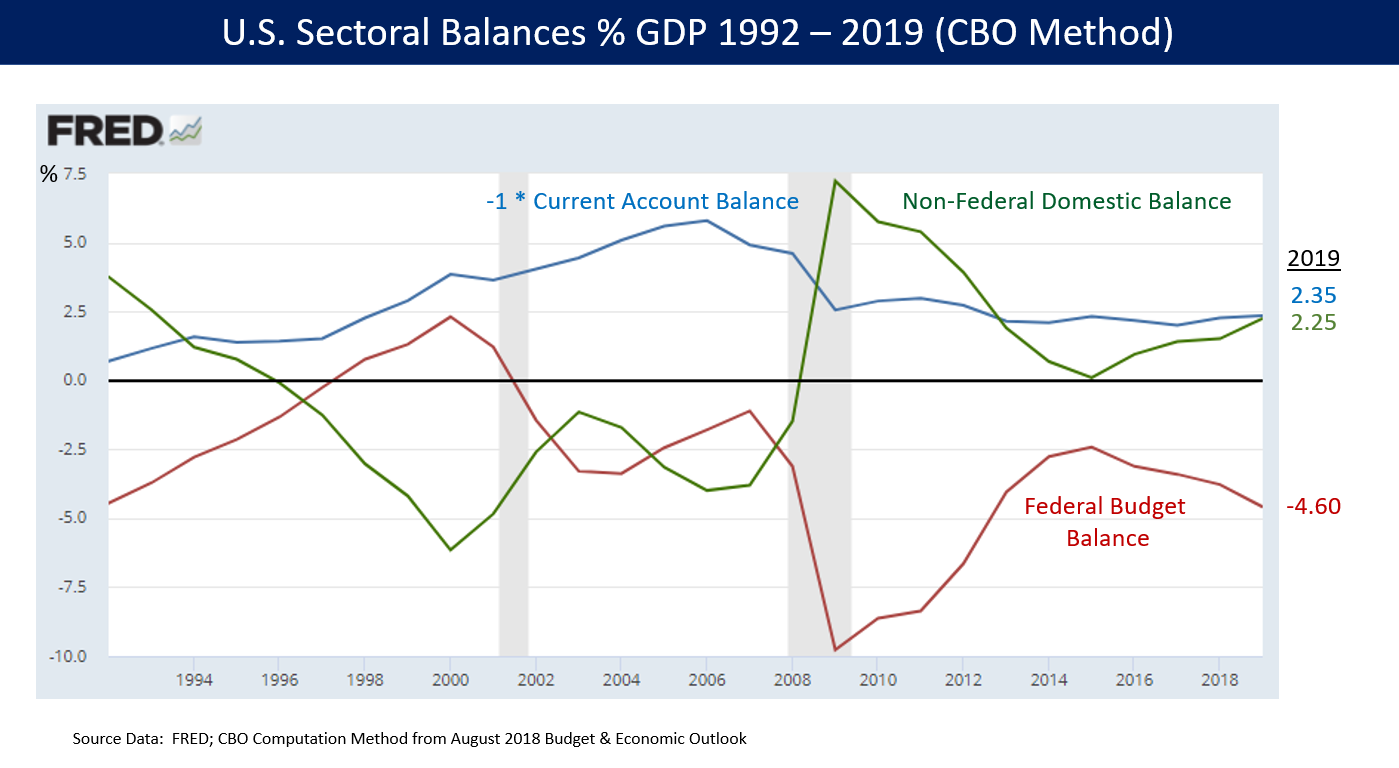
Sectoral balances using CBO data. Their method defines the balances as: A) Federal budget balance; B) Current Account (multiplied by -1 in the diagram); and C) Nonfederal Domestic Balance, representing mainly private sector net savings and the state and local government sector balance. The equation A+B+C=0 must hold by definition.

The U.S. Congressional Budget Office discussed sectoral balances in its August 2018 economic outlook: "For example, the unique pattern of the balances in the early years of this century reflected increased borrowing by households and businesses that later proved to be unsustainable. Starting with the recession of 2001 and continuing through the expansion of the early- to mid-2000s, both the federal government and the U.S. domestic private sector were net borrowers. That borrowing was funded by foreign investors, and current-account deficits climbed throughout the period, reaching an all-time high of 6.0% of gross domestic product (GDP) in fiscal year 2006. Following the onset of the 2007–2009 recession, the private sector drastically cut its borrowing while the federal government's borrowing dramatically increased." CBO also provided supplemental data used to calculate the three sectoral balances, which it defines as the federal budget balance, current account balance, and nonfederal domestic balance.

Economist Wynne Godley explained in 2004-2005 how U.S. sector imbalances posed a significant risk to the U.S. and global economy. The combination of a high and growing foreign sector surplus larger than the government sector deficit meant that the private sector was moving towards a net borrowing position (from surplus to deficit) as a housing bubble developed, which he warned was an unsustainable combination.

Economist Martin Wolf cites as an example the U.S., where sudden shifts in the private sector from deficit to surplus due to the Great Recession forced the government balance into deficit. "The financial balance of the private sector shifted towards surplus by the almost unbelievable cumulative total of 11.2 per cent of gross domestic product between the third quarter of 2007 and the second quarter of 2009, which was when the financial deficit of US government (federal and state) reached its peak...No fiscal policy changes explain the collapse into massive fiscal deficit between 2007 and 2009, because there was none of any importance. The collapse is explained by the massive shift of the private sector from financial deficit into surplus or, in other words, from boom to bust."

Economist Paul Krugman also explained in December 2011 the causes of the sizable shift from private deficit to surplus: "This huge move into surplus reflects the end of the housing bubble, a sharp rise in household saving, and a slump in business investment due to lack of customers."

Economists at the New Policy Institute explained in 2011 that: "In a healthy economy, businesses invest using money borrowed from households who are saving for future consumption. In the ideal world, this business sector deficit and household sector surplus are accompanied by net exports (a deficit for the rest of the world) and a small government deficit (to fund its own investment)."

== Sectoral balances description ==
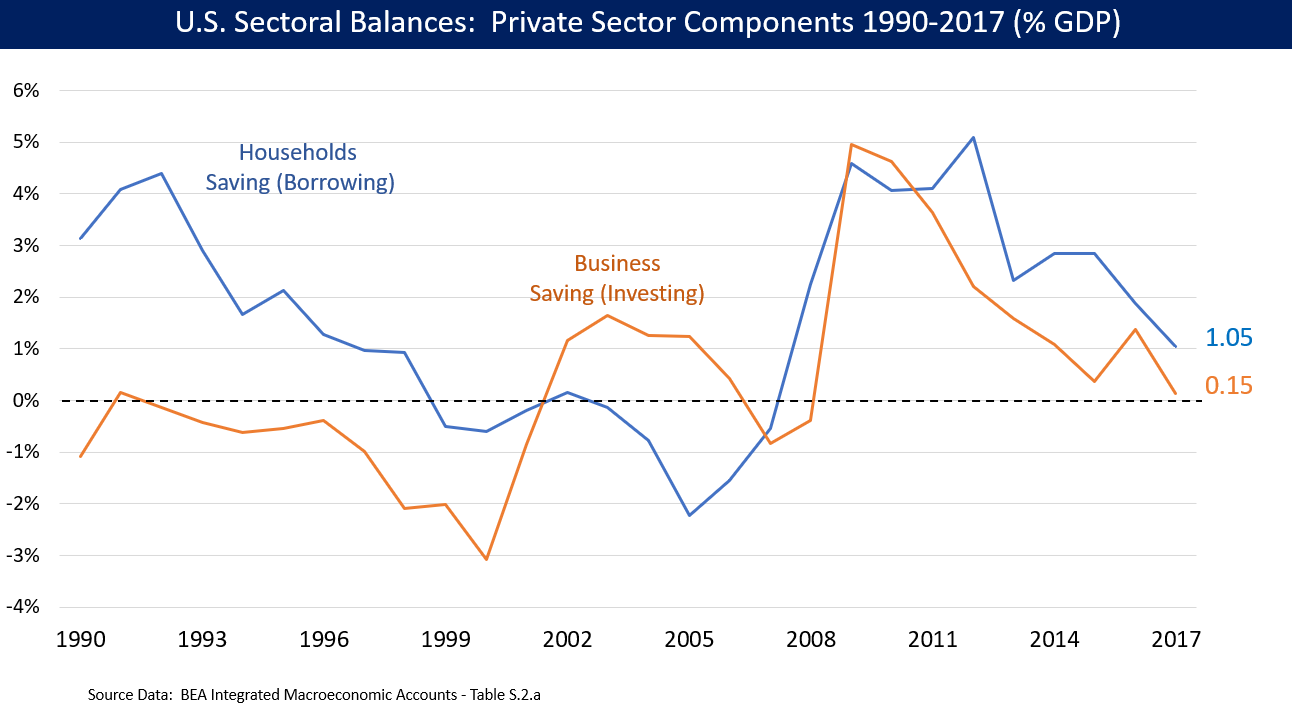
U.S. private sector balance showing household and business components separately from 1990-2017. Ideally, households are net savers (surplus balance) while businesses are net borrowers/investors (deficit balance). However, since the early 2000s, businesses have shifted to surpluses in most years. Since the foreign sector has remained in surplus, the U.S. has offset this with higher budget deficits. The sum of the two components equaled 1.2% GDP in 2017, which matches the private balance in the graph showing the three sectors.

GDP (Gross Domestic Product) is the total dollar value of all final goods and services produced within a country during a given year. GDP measures flows rather than stocks (example: the public deficit is a flow, the government debt is a stock). Flows are derived from the National Accounting relationship between aggregate spending and income. Ergo:

$$Y = C + I + G + (X - M)$$	1

where $Y$ is GDP (expenditure), $C$ is consumption spending, $I$ is private investment spending, $G$ is government spending, $X$ is exports and $M$ is imports (so $X - M$ = net exports).

Another perspective on the national income accounting is to note that households can use total income ($Y$) for the following uses:

$$Y = C + S + T$$	2

where $S$ is total saving and $T$ is total taxation (the other variables are as previously defined).

You then bring the two perspectives together (because they are both just “views” of $Y$) to write:

$$C + S + T = Y = C + I + G + (X - M)$$	3

You can then drop the $C$ (common on both sides) and you get:

$$S + T = I + G + (X - M)$$	4

Then you can convert this into the following sectoral balances accounting relations, which allow us to understand the influence of fiscal policy over private sector indebtedness. Hence, equation (4) can be rearranged to get the accounting identity for the three sectoral balances – private domestic, government budget and external:

$(S - I) = (G - T) + (X - M)$	5

or

$(S - I) + (M - X) + (T - G) = 0$	6

or

$(S - I) + (T - G) = (X - M)$	7

which implies that deficits at home (private and government) result in current account or trade deficits, and thus borrowing from abroad. Although we should be careful about implying causality in this way. If we rearrange the equation it is equally possible to imply that borrowing from abroad causes these deficits by pushing up the exchange rate.

The sectoral balances equation (5) says that total private savings ($S$) minus private investment ($I$) has to equal the public deficit (spending, $G$ minus taxes, $T$) plus net exports (exports ($X$) minus imports ($M$)), where net exports represent the net savings of non-residents.

Another way of saying this is that total private savings ($S$) is equal to private investment ($I$) plus the public deficit (spending, $G$ minus taxes, $T$) plus net exports (exports ($X$) minus imports ($M$)), where net exports represent the net savings of non-residents.

All these relationships (equations) hold as a matter of accounting and not matters of opinion.

Thus, when an external deficit ($X - M < 0$) and public surplus ($G - T < 0$) coincide, there must be a private deficit. While private spending can persist for a time under these conditions using the net savings of the external sector, the private sector becomes increasingly indebted in the process.

== Policy implications ==
In macroeconomics, the Modern Money Theory uses sectoral balances to define any transactions between the government sector and the non-government sector as a vertical transaction. The government sector is considered to include the treasury and the central bank, whereas the non-government sector includes private individuals and firms (including the private banking system) and the external sector – that is, foreign buyers and sellers. In any given time period, the government's budget can be either in deficit or in surplus. A deficit occurs when the government spends more than it taxes; and a surplus occurs when a government taxes more than it spends. Sectoral balances analysis states that as a matter of accounting, it follows that government budget deficits add net financial assets to the private sector. This is because a budget deficit means that a government has deposited more money into private bank accounts than it has removed in taxes. A budget surplus means the opposite: in total, the government has removed more money from private bank accounts via taxes than it has put back in via spending.

Therefore, budget deficits, by definition, are equivalent to adding net financial assets to the private sector; whereas budget surpluses remove financial assets from the private sector. This is represented by the identity: (G – T) = (S – I) – NX

which is

(Government sector balance) = (Private sector balance) – External sector balance

where G is government spending, T is taxes, S is savings, I is investment and NX is net exports.

The conclusion drawn from this is that private net saving is only possible when running a trade deficit if the government runs budget deficits; alternately, the private sector is forced to dis-save when the government runs a budget surplus and the trade deficit exists.

=== Government budget balance and inflation ===
According to the sectoral balances framework, government budget surpluses remove net savings from the private sector; in a time of high effective demand, this may lead to a private sector reliance on credit to finance consumption patterns. Hence, continual budget deficits are necessary for a growing economy that wants to avoid deflation. Therefore, budget surpluses are required only when the economy has excessive aggregate demand, and is in danger of inflation.

=== Government budget and trade balances ===
For a country like the U.S. with a government budget deficit and trade or current account deficit (i.e., foreign sector surplus), a policy that expands the government budget deficit must by definition increase the sum of the foreign and private sector surplus taken together. Recall the equation:

- (T-G) + (S - I) + (M - X) = 0

For example, the U.S. implemented sizable tax cuts in 2018 along with additional government spending, which expanded the federal budget deficit from -3.4% GDP in 2017 to -3.8% GDP in 2018, change of -0.4% GDP. The private sector surplus increased from 1.1% GDP to 1.4% GDP (+0.3% GDP), and the foreign sector surplus (U.S. current account deficit) increased from 2.3% GDP to 2.4% GDP (+0.1% GDP). The sum of the 2017 and 2018 balances are zero, as are the sum of the changes, as shown in the table below under the CBO method:

Year	Govt (T-G)	Private (S-I)	Foreign (M-X)	Sum
2017	-3.4	+1.1	+2.3	0
2018	-3.8	+1.4	+2.4	0
Change	-0.4	+0.3	+0.1	0

Alternatively, a policy that increases the budget deficit would also increase the trade or current account deficit (i.e., increase the foreign sector surplus), assuming the private sector balance is unchanged. Using the above example, if the private sector surplus had remained at 1.1% GDP in 2018, the foreign sector surplus (U.S. current account deficit) would have increased by +0.4%, from 2.3% GDP to 2.7% GDP.

== Austerity in the view of the sectoral balances approach ==
According to the sectoral balances approach, austerity can be counterproductive in a downturn due to a significant private-sector financial surplus, in which consumer savings is greater than business investment. In a healthy economy, the amount borrowed or invested by companies is greater than or equal to the private-sector savings placed into the banking system by consumers. However, if consumers have increased their savings but companies are not investing, a surplus develops in the banking system. Business investment is one of the major components of GDP.

Economist Richard Koo described similar effects for several of the developed world economies in December 2011: "Today private sectors in the U.S., the U.K., Spain, and Ireland (but not Greece) are undergoing massive deleveraging [paying down debt rather than spending] in spite of record low interest rates. This means these countries are all in serious balance sheet recessions. The private sectors in Japan and Germany are not borrowing, either. With borrowers disappearing and banks reluctant to lend, it is no wonder that, after nearly three years of record low interest rates and massive liquidity injections, industrial economies are still doing so poorly. Flow of funds data for the U.S. show a massive shift away from borrowing to savings by the private sector since the housing bubble burst in 2007. The shift for the private sector as a whole represents over 9 percent of U.S. GDP at a time of zero interest rates. Moreover, this increase in private sector savings exceeds the increase in government borrowings (5.8 percent of GDP), which suggests that the government is not doing enough to offset private sector deleveraging."

== See also ==
- Balances Mechanics – Economic model
- Barter economy – Direct reciprocal exchange of goods or services without the use of money
- Chartalism – Heterodox theory of money
- Circular flow of income – Model of the real economy
- Market economy – Type of economic system
- History of economic thought – Study of the development of economic thought
- Market – System in which parties engage in transactions according to supply and demand
- Modern Monetary Theory – Macroeconomic theory
- Stock-flow consistent model – Family of macroeconomic models
