= Voce (disambiguation) =

Voce is a defunct mobile phone company.

Voce may also refer to:

- Voce (surname)
- Voce (choir), a chamber choir based in Hartford, Connecticut
- Voce (song), a 2021 song by Madame
- Voce Chamber Choir, a London-based chamber choir
- Una Voce, a federation of Catholic lay organisations attached to the Tridentine Mass
- VoCE, a Japanese beauty magazine

== See also ==
- Yanni Voces, a 2008 Spanish-language album by Yanni
- La Voce (disambiguation)
- Você, a Portuguese pronoun
