= Voices =

Voices or The Voices may refer to:

== Film and television ==
- Voices (1920 film), by Chester M. De Vonde, with Diana Allen
- Voices (1973 film), a British horror film
- Voices (1979 film), a film by Robert Markowitz
- Voices (1995 film), a film about British composer Peter Warlock
- Voices (2007 film), a South Korean horror film
- The Voices, a 2014 horror comedy film
- "Voices" (Ghost Whisperer), an episode of the TV drama
- "Voices" (Star Wars: The Clone Wars)

== Literature ==
- Voices (Indriðason novel), a 2006 translation of a 2003 crime novel by Arnaldur Indriðason
- Voices (Le Guin novel), a 2006 novel by Ursula K. Le Guin
- Voices (magazine), a monthly English literary magazine 1919–1921
- The Voices (novel), a 1920 American novel by Mrs. I. Lowenberg
- The Voices, a 1969 book by Joseph Wechsberg
- The Voices, a 2003 novel by Susan Elderkin
- Voices, the former journal of The Association for Feminist Anthropology
- Shabdangal (transl. The Voices), a Malayalam-language novel by Indian writer Vaikom Muhammad Basheer

== Music ==
=== Groups ===
- Voices (British band), a London black metal band
- Voices (American band), an early 1990s R&B girl group
- Voices, former name of the a cappella group Voices in Your Head

=== Albums ===
- Voices (Claire Hamill album), 1986
- Voices (Gary Peacock album), 1971
- Voices (Hall & Oates album), 1980
- Voices (Judy Collins album), 1995
- Voices (Kenny Thomas album), 1991
- Voices (Matchbook Romance album), 2006
- Voices (Mike Stern album), 2001
- Voices (Murray Head album), 1981
- Voices (Phantogram album), 2014
- Voices (Roger Eno album), 1985
- Voices (Stan Getz album), 1967
- Voices (U of Memphis album), 2007
- Voices (Vangelis album), 1995
- Voices (Wormrot album), 2016
- Voices: WWE The Music, Vol. 9, a 2009 compilation album
- Yanni Voices, a 2009 album by Yanni

=== Songs ===
- Voices (Henze), a musical composition by Hans Werner Henze
- "Voices" (Alice in Chains song), 2013
- "Voices" (Ann Lee song), 1999
- "Voices" (Cheap Trick song), 1979
- "Voices" (Chris Young song), 2008
- "Voices" (Disclosure song), 2013
- "Voices" (Disturbed song), 2000
- "Voices" (KSI song), 2023
- "Voices" (Motionless in White song), 2017
- "Voices" (Saosin song), 2006
- "Voices" (Tusse song), 2021
- "Voices", a song by Against the Current from Past Lives, 2018
- "Voices", a song by Autopsy from Acts of the Unspeakable, 1992
- "Voices", a song by Crossfaith from The Artificial Theory for the Dramatic Beauty, 2009
- "Voices", a song by Crown the Empire from Limitless, 2011
- "Voices", a song by Dario G from Sunmachine, 1998
- "Voices", a song by Dave from Psychodrama (album), 2019
- "Voices", a song by Skye and XXXTentacion, 2019
- "Voices", a song by Dream Theater from Awake, 1994
- "Voices", a song by Godsmack from The Other Side, 2004
- "Voices", a song by Madonna from Hard Candy, 2008
- "Voices", a song by Our Last Night from Age of Ignorance, 2012
- "Voices", a song by Roxette from Pearls of Passion, 1986
- "Voices", a song by Russ Ballard, 1984
- "Voices", a song by Shakthisree Gopalan, 2012
- "Voices", a song by Sharpe & Numan from Automatic, 1989
- "Voices", a song by Stigmata from Hollow Dreams, 2003
- "Voices", a song by Switchfoot from Native Tongue, 2019
- "Voices", a song by Timothy B. Schmit from Playin' It Cool, 1984
- "Voices", a song by Zee from Identity, 1984
- "Voices", a song by MD.45 from The Craving, 1996

== Other uses ==
- Voices.com, a job search website for voice actors
- Voices movement (Australia), grassroots political organisations in Australia, whose names usually begin with "Voices of" or "Voices for"

== See also ==
- Voice (disambiguation)
- The Voice (disambiguation)
- Voicing (disambiguation)
- Auditory hallucination
