= La Voix de l'Est =

La Voix de l'Est may refer to:

- La Voix de l'Est (Bagnolet), a French Communist Party local weekly newspaper published from Bagnolet, France
- La Voix de l'Est (Granby), a French language daily in Granby, Quebec
