= La Voce =

La Voce may refer to:

- La Voce (album), by British tenor Russell Watson
- La Voce (magazine), an Italian literary magazine
- La Voce (newspaper), an Italian daily newspaper
- "La voce" (song), by Italian singer Laura Pausini

== See also ==
- Voce (disambiguation)
