= Voice (disambiguation) =

The human voice consists of sound made by a human being using the vocal tract.

Voice may also refer to:

- Voice (grammar), of a verb
- Voice (music), or part, a single strand of music within a larger ensemble or composition
- Voice (phonetics), in phonetics and phonology

== Arts, entertainment and media ==
=== Music ===
==== Albums and EPs ====
- Voice (Alison Moyet album), 2004
- Voice (Barratt Band album), 1983
- Voice (CNBLUE EP), 2009
- Voice (Emi Hinouchi album), 2011
- Voice (Hiromi album), 2011
- Voice (Hound Dog album), 1990
- Voice (Mika Nakashima album), 2008
- Voice (Neal Schon album), 2001
- Voice (Onew EP), 2018
- Voice (Taeyeon EP), 2019
- Voice (An Acoustic Collection), by Delerium, 2010
- Voice – The Best of Beverley Knight, 2006
  - Voice – The Best of Tour

==== Songs and composition ====
- Voice (Ai song), 2013
- "Voice" (Perfume song), 2010
- "Voice" (Porno Graffitti song), 2001
- "Voice", a song by Baek Ji-young, 2012
- "목소리" ('Voice'), a song by Loona from the 2020 EP 12:00
- "Voice", a song by VNV Nation from the 1998 album Praise the Fallen
- "Voices", a song from the 1994 anime series Macross Plus
- Voice (Takemitsu), a 1971 composition for solo flute by Toru Takemitsu

=== Film and television ===
- Voice (2005 film), a South Korean horror film
- Voice (2021 film), a South Korean crime film
- Voice (TV series), a 2017 South Korean TV series
- Voice – Danmarks største stemme, a Danish reality singing competition

=== Other uses in arts and entertainment ===
- Character's voice, a character's manner of speech
- Voice acting
- Voice (manga), later Voiceful
- Writer's voice

== Political parties ==
- Civic Liberal Alliance (Croatian: Građansko-liberalni savez, abbr. GLAS - lit. Voice), a liberal Croatian political party
- Hlas (Czech political party) (Eng. "Voice"), a liberal political party in the Czech Republic
- Holos (political party) (Eng. "Voice"), a Ukrainian liberal and pro-European political party
- Voice – Social Democracy (aka Hlas), a left-wing democratic Slovak political party
- Vox (political party) (Eng. "Voice"), a right-wing populist Spanish political party
- We–The Voice from the People (Mi–Glas iz naroda), a right-wing populist Serbian political party

== Other organisations ==
- Victims of Immigration Crime Engagement, a U.S. government agency
- Voice (trade union), a British trade union

== Other uses ==
- Vaginal and Oral Interventions to Control the Epidemic (VOICE), a clinical trial
- Venus Volcano Imaging and Climate Explorer (VOICE), a proposed Venus orbiter mission
- Voice, editions of Lerner Newspapers
- Voice, weekly newspaper published by Australian Labor Party (Tasmanian Branch) 1951–1953 (renamed from People's Voice, 1925–1931)
- Voices groups in Australia

== See also ==
- Singing
- Victims of Iranian Censorship Act, also known as VOICE Act
- Vocal music
- The Voice (disambiguation)
- Voices (disambiguation)
- Voicing (disambiguation)
- Vox (disambiguation)
- Voyce, a surname
