= La Voix (disambiguation) =

La Voix is the Quebec version of the TV reality show The Voice.

La Voix (the voice in French) may also refer to:

== Film and television ==
- The Voice (French TV series), the French television version of The Voice
- The Voice (1992 film), a French film directed by Pierre Granier-Deferre

== Media / Press ==
- La Voix de l'Est (Bagnolet), a Communist Party local weekly published from Bagnolet, France
- La Voix de l'Est (Granby), a French-language daily published in Granby, Quebec
- La Voix des Belges, a bi-monthly clandestine newspaper published by the Belgian Belgian National Movement
- La Voix des Femmes (France, 1848), a French feminist periodical
- La Voix des femmes (France, 1917), a French feminist periodical
- La Voix du Luxembourg, a French-language daily newspaper published in Luxembourg
- La Voix du Nord, a French regional daily in Lille, France

== Music ==
- "La Voix" (song), a 2009 Swedish Eurovision song by Malena Ernman
- La voix du bon Dieu, a French album by French-Canadian singer Céline Dion
  - "La voix du bon Dieu" (song), from the album

== People ==
- La Voix (drag queen), British drag performer and singer

== See also ==
- Lavoie
- The Voice (disambiguation)
- La Voz (disambiguation)
