= Morris Copeland =

American economist

- Morris Copeland
- Born: 6 August 1895; Rochester, New York
- Died: 4 May 1989 (aged 93); Sarasota, Florida

Academic background
- Influences: Thorstein Veblen, Walter W. Stewart, Wesley Mitchell, John Maurice Clark

Academic work
- Discipline: Political economics
- School or tradition: Institutional economics
- Institutions: Cornell University 1921–1930, 1949–1965; NBER 1944–1959
- Notable ideas: Flow of Funds analysis Monetary circuit theory Social accounting Stock-Flow Consistency

Morris Albert Copeland (August 6, 1895 – May 4, 1989) was an American economist who criticized 20th-century macroeconomic theory, and who contributed to the development of modern flow of funds theory.

== Life ==
Born and raised in Rochester New York, Copeland began his university education at Amherst with an interest in philosophy and Greek. Late in his undergraduate studies he encountered teachers Walter W. Stewart and Walton Hamilton and became fascinated with social accounting and economics. After graduating in 1917 he went on to the University of Chicago for his graduate studies where he came under the influence of Wesley Mitchell, a man who he came to regard as his mentor and good friend. After his doctoral thesis on institutional theory of value supervised by John Maurice Clark, Copeland emerged as an "unreconstructed institutionalist".

After receiving his Ph.D. in 1921, Copeland began teaching economics at Cornell and became a full professor in 1928. Copeland left a lasting impression on generations of students with a socratic teaching style that motivated students to come to their own conclusions. While his manner was described as "courtly", he subjected his students to intense challenge, both with their deductions and the empirical support for their propositions.

== Contributions to economics ==
Copeland shared the institutionalist skepticism of "economic laws" that purport to be applicable outside of specific historical institutional contexts. He viewed orthodox theory more as expressions of doctrine rather than empirical observation. For example, he saw the quantity theory of money as a mathematical device convenient for neoclassical doctrine rather than as a hypothesis that emerged from solid empirical observation of economic data. Rather than base economics on introspection and mental states that cannot be empirically verified, he wished to engage in what he viewed as a more science-based approach which necessarily proceeds first from observations about an economy's actual behavior. While organizing principles might be inferred from such observations, the institutionalist perspective was that they are in constant flux and subject to a broader social context. For this reason Copeland published not just in economic publications, but in journals of philosophy, political science, psychology, statistics and accounting.

=== Copeland's money flow model ===
Copeland is recognized for his pioneering work in the study of money flows. He recognized that the social accounting perspective which was used in the study of national income could be enlarged and applied to the study of money flows. In 1949 he introduced his quadruple entry principle - a scheme enlarged on by Hyman Minsky to emphasize the time-dated pattern of cash commitments to examine the microeconomic basis of financial system instability. Copeland further developed and applied his perspective in his book "A Study of Moneyflows in the United States". According to Copeland, when you look at the economy from the micro perspective of money flows, it provides a powerful new way making phenomena visible that are simply abstracted away by the orthodox Keynesian and Monetarist models. Copeland's flow of funds set of accounts provides an alternative framework and analytical insights that is unavailable from either the Keynesian NIPA framework or the monetarist quantity theory of money framework. His framework was later developed into Stock-flow consistent models.

Copeland is recognized as an early Post Keynesian, presenting the view that "the changes Keynes introduced represented modifications of neoclassicism, not its rejection".

For his innovations in money flow theory, many colleagues believed that Copeland should have received the Nobel Prize.

=== Public service ===
In 1933 Copeland took leave to become executive secretary of the Central Statistical Board created by executive order as part of Franklin D. Roosevelt's response to the Great Depression. For his statistical accomplishments in the early years of the New Deal, in 1936 he was elected as a Fellow of the American Statistical Association. In 1944, Copeland joined Mitchell at the National Bureau of Economic Research in order to work on money flows research, which after 1947 was continued under the auspices of the Federal Reserve. According to Jacob Cohen who in 1972 performed a review of money flow analysis since 1947, "the breadth of Copeland's moneyflows has been substantially narrowed in the hands of the Federal Reserve and foreign account-makers." As part of its integration into the National Income and Product Accounts system, John Dawson observes that Copeland's flow of funds analysis was compromised by removal of his money circuit calculations.

== Publications ==
- (1949) "Social Accounting for Moneyflows." The Accounting Review 24(3): 254–264.
- (1952) A Study in Moneyflows in the United States, National Bureau of Economic Research/ Arno Press
- (1958) Fact and Theory in Economics: The Testimony of an Institutionalist, University of Michigan/Cornell University Press
- (1961) "Trends in Government Financing." National Bureau of Economic Research
- (1964) Our Free Enterprise Economy. Collier Macmillan ISBN 978-0023247903
- (1966) Toward Full Employment in our Free Enterprise Economy. University of Michigan/Fordham University Press
- (1981) Essays in Socioeconomic Evolution. Vantage Press

== See also ==
- History of macroeconomic thought
