= Centre of Planning and Economic Research =

Greek research center

The Centre of Planning and Economic Research (KEPE) was established in 1959 as a research unit, under the title "Centre for Economic Research", to study the challenges faced by the Greek economy and encourage economic research in Greece and further cooperation with other scientific institutions.

== History ==
In 1964, KEPE acquired its present name and organizational structure along with the additional charges of preparing development plans, analyzing contemporary developments in the Greek economy, engaging in short and medium-term forecasts, formulating proposals for development policies and training young economists in the fields of planning and economic development.

Today, KEPE is a leading economics research institute in Greece. It focuses on applied research projects concerning the Greek economy, and provides expert advice to the Greek government on economic and social policy issues. In April 2019, the Greek government formally appointed KEPE as the National Productivity Board for Greece.

== Board of Directors & Research Fellows ==
KEPE is governed by a board of directors appointed by the Minister for Development and Competitiveness. Research Fellows at KEPE concentrate on four areas of empirical research: (a) macroeconomic analysis and projections, (b) fiscal and monetary policy, (c) human resources and social policies, and (d) sectoral analysis and policy.

== Publications ==
The Centre's research output includes publications in the following series:

- Studies, i.e., monographs which investigate specific economic issues through the application of modern analytical methods.
- Reports, i.e., works which analyse in a systematic manner sectoral, regional, or national economic issues.
- Annual Reports of the Greek National Productivity Board.
- Discussion Papers, i.e., papers on ongoing research projects.
- Research collaborations, i.e., research projects prepared in cooperation with other research institutes.
- A four-monthly review, entitled "Greek Economic Outlook". (ISSN 2623-369X).
- A monthly review, entitled "Greek Economy".

Apart from the above publications, KEPE has is very active in the production of unpublished studies, reports and position papers assigned by ministries or other bodies, aimed at supporting economic policy decisions.

== Library ==
KEPE runs a specialised research library, with a rich collection of Greek and international books and journals in economics and social sciences at large. In addition, KEPE is in contact with similar foreign institutions, and exchanges publications, views and information on current economic developments and research methods.
