= News Reno =

Defunct free newspaper

- Type: Weekly newspaper
- Format: 12-full size newspaper
- Owner: Miguel Sepulveda
- Founder(s): Miguel Sepulveda, Sheila Sepulveda
- Founded: 1983

News Reno, also known as Ahora News Reno, was a Hispanic-American newspaper which was distributed for free throughout the city of Reno, Nevada.

== History ==
Ahora News Reno began being published in 1983 and continued until 2009. It was distributed entirely free of charge for the population of Reno. The format of the newspaper was 12-full size newspaper pages.

The publisher and owner was the activist Miguel Sepulveda. He started the newspaper along with the help of his wife Sheila. The paper also participated in organizing large events like Ricky Martin concerts in Reno.

The estimated circulation was 13,000 per year. The main topics covered by the newspaper were culture, and ethnic society.

The newspaper was published in both English and Spanish languages. The Ahora News Reno newspaper circulated in Reno, Nevada, as well as the Eastern California Area.

After the death of her husband, Sheila Sepulveda kept the newspaper going with the help of her son Steve Sepulveda and daughter in law Martine Sepulveda. The paper is considered the first Latino-American newspaper in Reno, and paved the way for other similar publications like La Voz Hispana and El Sol de Nevada.
