= Voyce =

Voyce is a surname. Notable people with the surname include:

- Edward Voyce (1633–1713), English clergyman
- Inez Voyce (1924–2022), American baseball player
- Julie Voyce (born 1957), Canadian artist
- Kaye Voyce, costume designer in New York City
- Tom Voyce (1981–2024), English rugby union player, played for various clubs and England
- Tom Voyce (rugby union, born 1897), played for Gloucester and England

== See also ==
- Voce (surname)
