= Balance sheet recession =

Type of economic recession

A balance sheet recession is a type of economic recession that occurs when high levels of private sector debt cause individuals or companies to collectively focus on saving by paying down debt rather than spending or investing, causing economic growth to slow or decline. The term is attributed to economist Richard Koo and is related to the debt deflation concept described by economist Irving Fisher. Recent examples include Japan's recession that began in 1990 and the U.S. recession of 2007-2009.

== Definition ==
A balance sheet recession is a particular type of recession driven by the high levels of private sector debt (i.e., the credit cycle) rather than fluctuations in the business cycle. It is characterized by a change in private sector behavior towards saving (i.e., paying down debt) rather than spending, which slows the economy through a reduction in consumption by households or investment by business. The term balance sheet derives from an accounting equation that holds that assets must always equal the sum of liabilities plus equity. If asset prices fall below the value of the debt incurred to purchase them, then the equity must be negative, meaning the consumer or business is insolvent. Until it regains solvency, the entity will focus on debt repayment. It has been argued that a balance sheet recession essentially is the same phenomenon that the German economist Wilhelm Röpke and Austrian School economists in the 1930s denoted as a secondary deflation.

== Causes ==
High levels of indebtedness or the bursting of a real estate or financial asset price bubble can cause a balance sheet recession. This is when large numbers of consumers or corporations pay down debt (i.e., save) rather than spend or invest, which slows the economy. Economist Richard C. Koo wrote in 2009 that under ideal conditions, a country's economy should have the household sector as net savers and the corporate sector as net borrowers, with the government budget nearly balanced and net exports near zero. When imbalances develop across these sectors, recession can develop within the country or create pressure for recession in another country. Policy responses are often designed to drive the economy back towards this ideal state of balance.

Rather than savings by households being invested by businesses, as is the case under typical economic conditions, the savings remains in the banking system and will not be invested by businesses regardless of the interest rate. A large private sector financial surplus (savings greater than investment), a proverbial "hole" in the economy, can develop.

Paul Krugman wrote in July 2014: "The logic of a balance sheet recession is straightforward. Imagine that for whatever reason people have grown careless about both borrowing and lending, so that many families and/or firms have taken on high levels of debt. And suppose that at some point people more or less suddenly realize that these high debt levels are risky. At that point, debtors will face strong pressures from their creditors to “deleverage,” slashing their spending in an effort to pay down debt. But when many people slash spending at the same time, the result will be a depressed economy. This can turn into a self-reinforcing spiral, as falling incomes make debt seem even less supportable, leading to deeper cuts; but in any case, the overhang of debt can keep the economy depressed for a long time."

Martin Wolf wrote in July 2012: "Now consider what happens when the asset prices start to fall. Debtors will be unambiguously poorer. Creditors will also feel poorer, since their assets will have deteriorated in quality. Financial intermediaries will become both insolvent and illiquid. There is likely to be a systemic financial crisis. The supply of credit to the private sector will halt. Borrowing will shrink. Investment, particularly in new housing, will collapse. The desired savings of the heavily indebted will rise, as they seek to pay down excessive debt. Creditors, too, will become far more cautious, as they recognise how vulnerable they have become to a wave of bankruptcy among their debtors. The overall effect will be big cutbacks in spending and a deep recession, if not worse. A big financial crisis will accelerate the cuts and turn the recession into a potential depression. That is, of course, what happened in 2008. The effects of the emergence of balance-sheet constraints on spending and borrowing will, in brief, be revealed in the huge financial surpluses in the private sectors of crisis-hit economies."

== Historical examples ==
=== Japan 1990–2005 ===
For example, economist Richard Koo wrote that Japan's "Great Recession" that began in 1990 was a "balance sheet recession". It was triggered by a collapse in land and stock prices, which caused Japanese firms to have negative equity, meaning their assets were worth less than their liabilities. Despite zero interest rates and expansion of the money supply to encourage borrowing, Japanese corporations in aggregate opted to pay down their debts from their own business earnings rather than borrow to invest as firms typically do. Corporate investment, a key demand component of GDP, fell enormously (22% of GDP) between 1990 and its peak decline in 2003. Japanese firms overall became net savers after 1998, as opposed to borrowers. Koo argues that it was massive fiscal stimulus (borrowing and spending by the government) that offset this decline and enabled Japan to maintain its level of GDP. In his view, this avoided a U.S. type Great Depression, in which U.S. GDP fell by 46%. He argued that monetary policy (e.g., central banks lowering key interest rates) was ineffective because there was limited demand for funds while firms paid down their liabilities, even at near-zero interest rates. In a balance sheet recession, GDP declines by the amount of debt repayment and un-borrowed individual savings, leaving government stimulus spending as the primary remedy.

Koo wrote in 2010 that firms may switch from a profit maximization objective to debt minimization until they are solvent (i.e., equity is positive). This may take a long time; when the bubble burst in 1990, corporate demand for funds immediately collapsed, and by 1995, the demand was negative, meaning that Japanese companies were making net pay downs of their debt. The demand remained negative for 10 years, until 2005. This happened despite near zero interest rates.

=== United States 2007–2009 ===
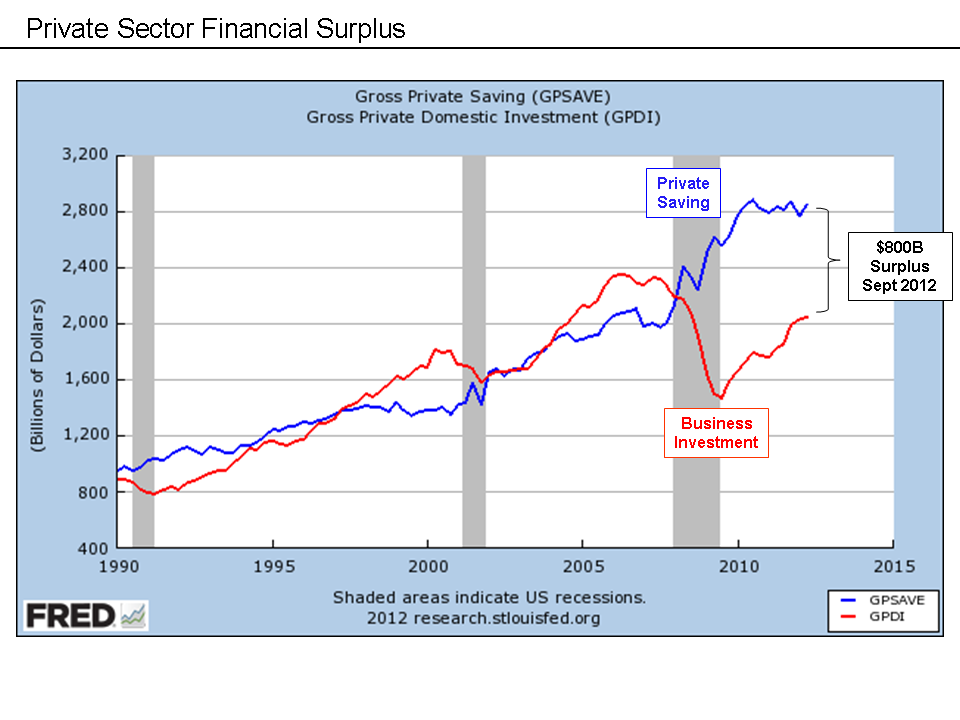
U.S. savings and investment; savings greater than investment indicates a large private sector financial surplus, indicative of a balance sheet recession

Economist Paul Krugman wrote in 2014 that "the best working hypothesis seems to be that the financial crisis was only one manifestation of a broader problem of excessive debt--that it was a so-called "balance sheet recession".

U.S. household debt rose from approximately 65% GDP in Q1 2000 to 95% by Q1 2008. This was driven by a housing bubble, which encouraged Americans to take on larger mortgages and use home equity lines of credit to fuel consumption. Mortgage debt rose from $4.9 trillion in Q1 2000 to a peak of $10.7 trillion by Q2 2008. However, it has fallen since as households deleverage, to $9.3 trillion by Q1 2014.

While U.S. savings rose significantly during the 2007–2009 recession, both residential and non-residential investment fell significantly, approximately $560 billion between Q1 2008 and Q4 2009. This moved the private sector financial balance (gross private savings minus gross private domestic investment) from an approximately $200 billion deficit in Q4 2007 to a surplus of $1.4 trillion by Q3 2009. This surplus remained elevated at $720 billion (~$963 billion in 2025) in Q1 2014. This illustrates the core issue in a balance sheet recession, that an enormous amount of savings was tied up in the banking system, rather than being invested.

The decline in housing prices also caused U.S. household equity to plummet, from a peak of $13.4 trillion in Q1 2006 to $6.1 trillion by Q1 2009, a 54% decline. Household equity began to rise after Q4 2011 and was back to $10.8 trillion by Q1 2014, approximately 80% of its pre-crisis peak level. Such a decline in equity shifts household behavior towards deleveraging, as indicated by the reduction in mortgage balances since Q2 2008 described above.

A July 2012 survey of balance sheet recession research reported that consumer demand and employment are affected by household leverage levels. Both durable and non-durable goods consumption declined as households moved from low to high leverage with the decline in property values experienced during the subprime mortgage crisis. In other words, according to the accounting equation, as the value of their primary asset (homes) fell, mortgage debt initially remained fixed, so equity also fell, causing the ratio of debt to equity (a measure of leverage) to rise. This sudden increase in leverage, causing consumers to shift from spending to paying down debt, can account for a significant decline in employment levels, as employers cut back due to concerns of lower consumer demand. Policies that help reduce mortgage debt or household leverage could therefore have stimulative effects.

Economist Martin Wolf wrote in 2012 that the financial crisis in the U.S. was a balance sheet recession: "The overall story, then, is of an economy driven not by fiscal policy decisions, but by private sector decisions taken for reasons that have nothing to do with the long-run fiscal prospects of the economy. Meanwhile, the government, as a whole, was driven into huge deficit by these private sector decisions. That is exactly what one expects to happen in a huge balance-sheet recession, such as this one."

Economists Atif Mian and Amir Sufi wrote in 2014 that:

- Historically, severe economic downturns are almost always preceded by a sharp increase in household debt.
- U.S. household spending declines were largest in geographic areas with a combination of higher household debt and larger housing price declines.
- When housing prices fall, poorer homeowners (with a larger proportion of their net worth in their home) are hit the hardest financially and reduce their consumption relatively more than wealthier households.
- Declines in residential investment preceded the recession and were followed by reductions in household spending and then non-residential business investment as the recession worsened.

== Policy response ==
Responses to recessions typically include fiscal stimulus through higher government deficits and monetary stimulus, such as lower interest rates and monetary creation. However, the solvency (net worth) of economic actors is a third important element when dealing with a balance sheet recession, as either asset price declines must be reversed or debt levels reduced, or combination of both.

In Krugman's view, balance sheet recessions require private sector debt reduction strategies (e.g., mortgage refinancing) combined with higher government spending to offset declines from the private sector as it pays down its debt, writing in July 2014: "Unlike a financial panic, a balance sheet recession can’t be cured simply by restoring confidence: no matter how confident they may be feeling, debtors can’t spend more if their creditors insist they cut back. So offsetting the economic downdraft from a debt overhang requires concrete action, which can in general take two forms: fiscal stimulus and debt relief. That is, the government can step in to spend because the private sector can’t, and it can also reduce private debts to allow the debtors to spend again. Unfortunately, we did too little of the first and almost none of the second."

Krugman discussed the balance sheet recession concept during 2010, agreeing with Koo's situation assessment and view that sustained deficit spending when faced with a balance sheet recession would be appropriate. However, Krugman argued that monetary policy could also affect savings behavior, as inflation or credible promises of future inflation (generating negative real interest rates) would encourage less savings. In other words, people would tend to spend more rather than save if they believe inflation is on the horizon. In more technical terms, Krugman argues that the private sector savings curve is elastic even during a balance sheet recession (responsive to changes in real interest rates) disagreeing with Koo's view that it is inelastic (non-responsive to changes in real interest rates).

== See also ==
- Kondratiev wave also refer to as long wave cycle
- Debt overhang the phenomena on an individual scale
