= St Michael's Victory over the Devil =

Wall-mounted 1958 bronze sculpture by Jacob Epstein

Coordinates: 52.4081°N 1.5067°W

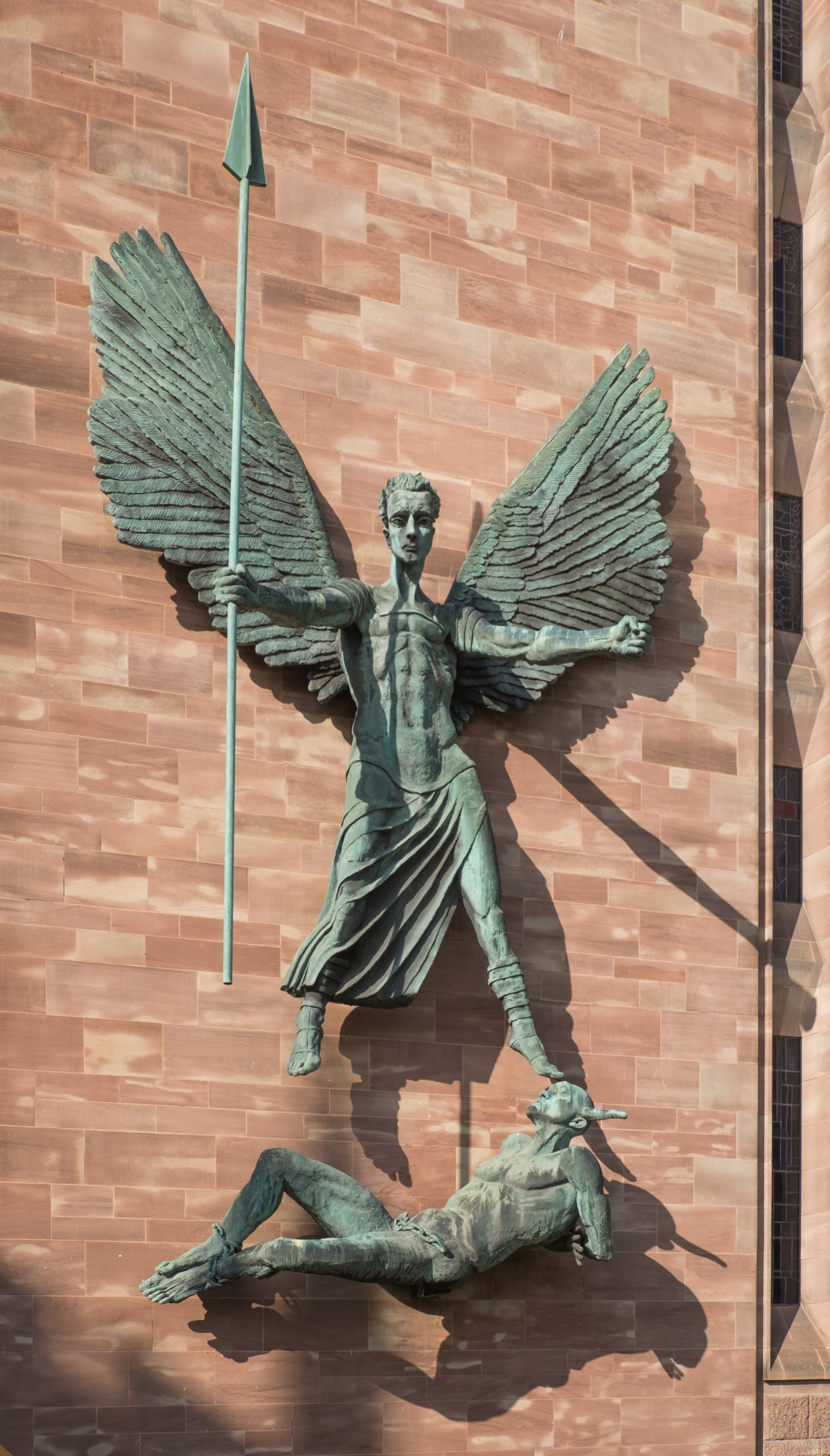
St Michael's Victory over the Devil (1958), at Coventry Cathedral

St Michael's Victory over the Devil is a 1958 bronze sculpture by Jacob Epstein, displayed on the south end of the east wall outside of the new Coventry Cathedral, above the steps leading up from Priory Street to the cathedral's entrance and beside the stained glass of John Piper's bowed baptistry window. The cathedral is dedicated to St Michael.

The sculpture symbolises the victory of good over evil, and depicts a winged angel with spear, standing with arms and legs spread above the bound figure of the horned devil lying supine. The larger than life statue stands some 25 ft (7.6 m) high, with the angel's wings spreading 23 ft (7.0 m). For the face of the angel, Epstein made busts of his daughter Kitty's two husbands, Lucian Freud and Wynne Godley, and selected Godley as his model.

Epstein was first asked to make a maquette, a small model about 18 in (46 cm) high. He made several preliminary studies in plasticine and bronze, and had started to work on the main work by the time his commission was approved in 1957. Reportedly, some members of the cathedral reconstruction committee objected to Epstein being commissioned, with one complaining "But he is a Jew", to which the architect Basil Spence responded "So was Jesus Christ". A similar controversy had arisen before, when Epstein created his floating lead statue of the Virgin Mother and Holy Child for the Convent of the Holy Child in Cavendish Square, London (now the offices of the King's Fund).

The sculpture was one of the last major works of art completed by Epstein before his death on 21 August 1959. It was cast in bronze and unveiled at the cathedral in 1961 by Epstein's widow, Kathleen.

A 53.6 cm (21.1 in) high bronze maquette was sold at Christie's in 2014 for £15,000. One maquette now resides in the chapel of Wesley House, Cambridge.

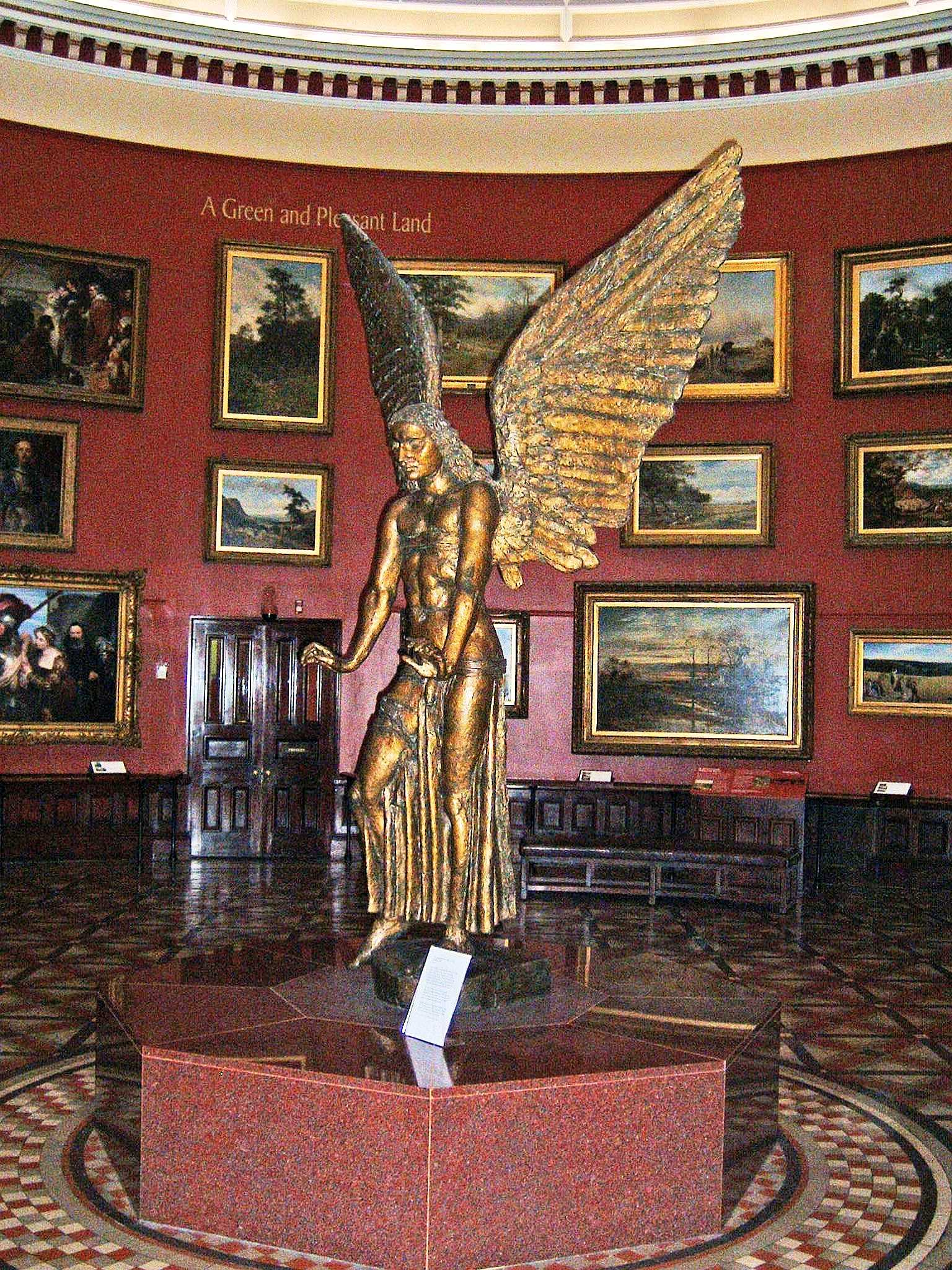
Epstein's Lucifer (1944–45), Birmingham Museum and Art Gallery

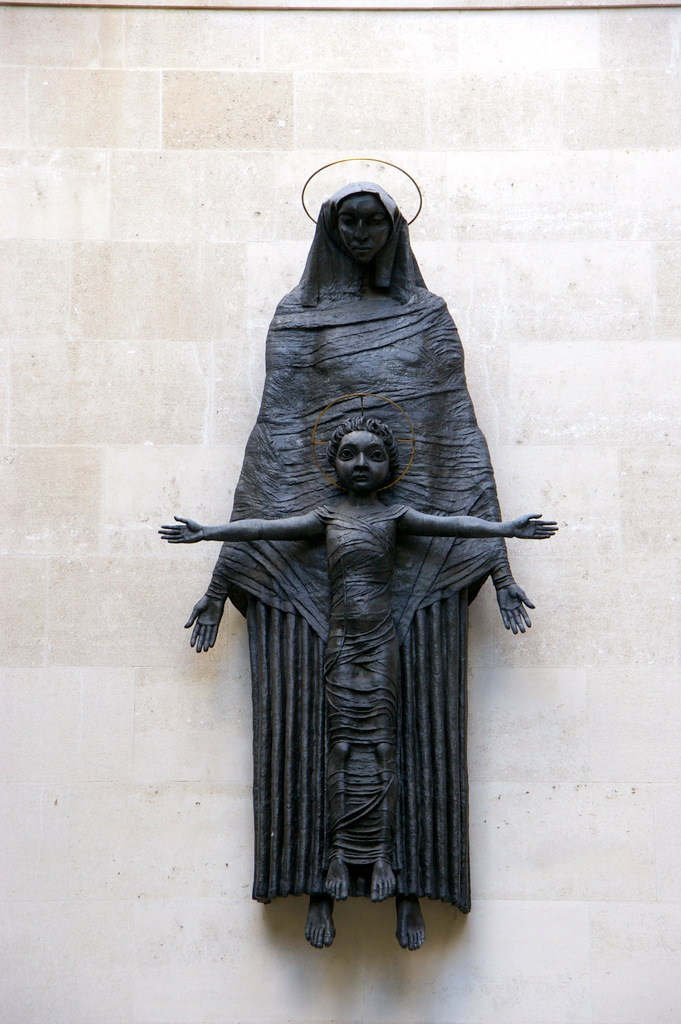
Epstein's Virgin Mother and Holy Child (1952), Cavendish Square

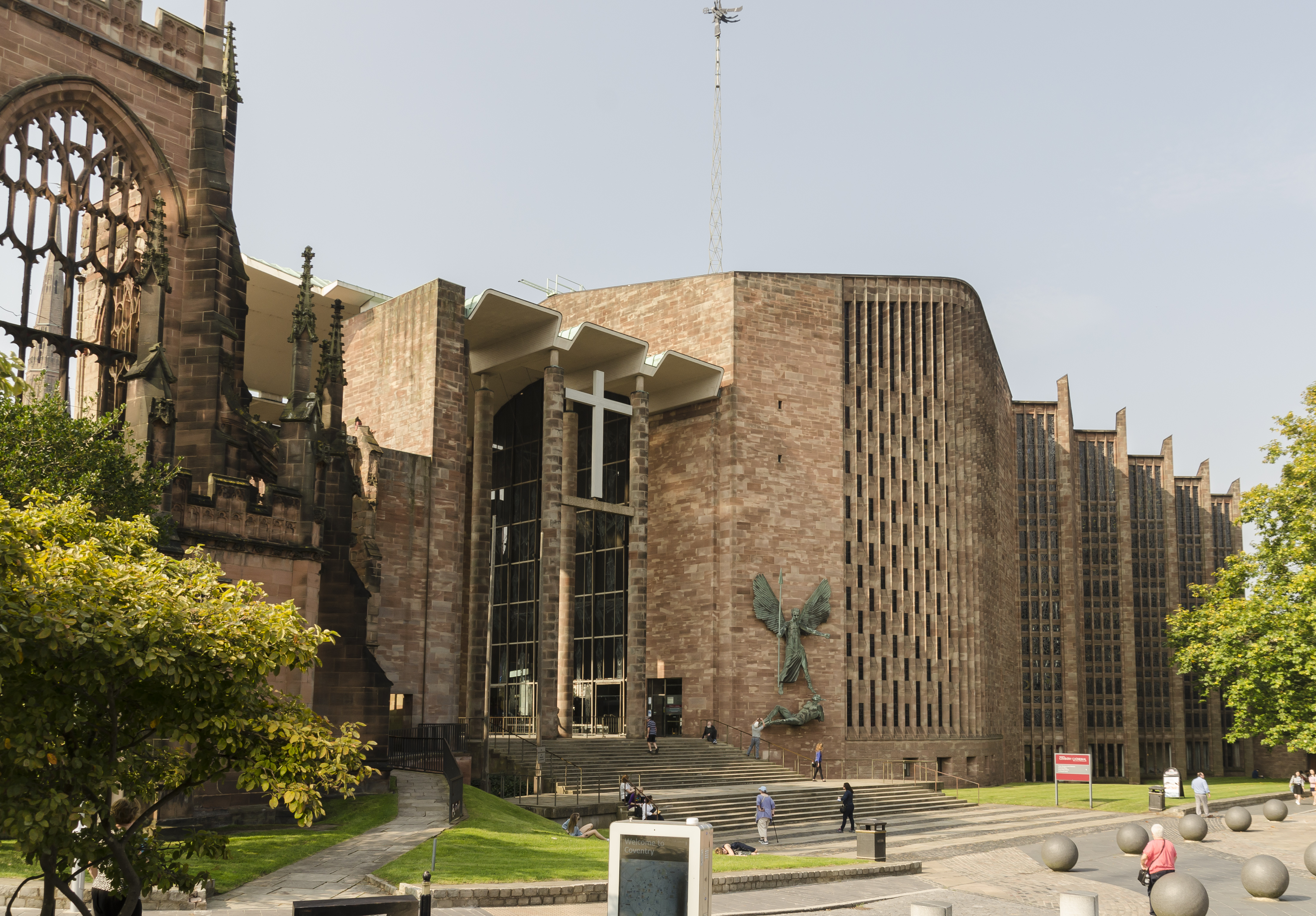
The sculpture on the east wall of Coventry Cathedral

== See also ==
- List of sculptures by Jacob Epstein
