= The Voice =

The Voice may refer to:

== Fictional entities ==
- The Voice or Presence, a fictional representation of God in DC Comics
- The Voice (Dune), a fictional ability in the Dune universe
- The Voice, a character in the American TV series Cleopatra 2525

== Film ==
- The Voice (1920 film), a German silent drama film
- "The Voice" (Australian Playhouse), an Australian television play
- The Voice (1982 film), a Soviet psychological drama film
- The Voice (1992 film), a French drama film
- The Voice (2010 film), a Turkish horror film
- The Voice, a 2005 film directed by Johan Söderberg

== Publications ==
=== Books and stories ===
- "The Voice", a story featuring The Shadow, a fictional vigilante
- The Voice (Bible translation), a 2011–2012 translation of the Christian Bible published by Thomas Nelson
- The Voice (novel), by Gabriel Okara, 1964
- The Voice (poetry collection), by Thomas Hardy, 1912

=== Newspapers and magazines ===
- The Voice, the newspaper published by Winnipeg Labour Party, Canada
- The Voice (Adelaide newspaper), an Australian newspaper, published 1892–1894
- The Voice (Botswana), a print and online newspaper
- The Voice (British newspaper), an Afro-Caribbean weekly newspaper
- The Voice (Cornwall newspaper), a Cornwall newspaper
- The Voice (Tasmanian newspaper), a weekly Australian newspaper published 1951–1953 (formerly People's Voice)
- The Voice Magazine, a student publication of Athabasca University, Canada
- The Voice of Saint Lucia, a newspaper published in Saint Lucia, Caribbean
- The Voice Weekly, a former news journal in Burmese language

== Music ==
=== Albums and EPs ===
- The Voice (Bobby McFerrin album), 1984
- The Voice (Kokia album), 2008
- The Voice (Mavis Staples album), 1993
- The Voice (Mike Jones album), 2009
- The Voice (Russell Watson album), 2000
- The Voice (SG Wannabe EP), 2015
- The Voice (Vicious Rumors EP), 1994
- The Voice (Vusi Mahlasela album), 2003
- The Voice (Lil Durk album), 2020
- The Voice, an album by David Phelps, 2008
- The Voice: Frank Sinatra, the Columbia Years (1943–1952), 1986
- The Voice of Frank Sinatra, 1946
- The Voice (Jay Perez album), 1995
- The Voice, an album by Vern Gosdin, 1998

=== Songs ===
- "The Voice" (The Moody Blues song), 1981
- "The Voice" (Ultravox song), 1981
- "The Voice" (Eimear Quinn song), winner of the 1996 Eurovision Song Contest
- "The Voice", a song by The Alan Parsons Project on their album I Robot
  - Not to be confused with their cover of the John Farnham song "You're the Voice"

== People known as "The Voice" ==
=== Most commonly ===
- Whitney Houston (1963–2012), an American singer

=== Others ===
- Jay Black (1938-2021), an American singer
- Russ Bray (born 1957), a British darts referee
- Lil Durk (born 1992), an American rapper
- Vern Gosdin (1934–2009), an American singer
- Roger Huston (born 1942), an American harness race announcer
- Sandi Patty (born 1956), an American singer
- Steve Perry (born 1949), an American singer
- Frank Sinatra (1915-1998), an American singer
- Lenny Zakatek (born 1947), a British singer

== Television and radio ==
=== Television shows ===
- The Voice (franchise), an international reality television singing competition
  - The Voice (franchise) § The Voice around the world includes a list of local titles in the franchise
- The Voice (Hong Kong TV series), a singing competition (not part of The Voice franchise)
- "The Voice" (Seinfeld), a 1997 episode of the NBC sitcom
- "The Voice" (The Amazing World of Gumball), an episode of the TV series
- "The Voice", episodes of Dynasty (1981 TV series)

=== Television channels ===
- The Voice TV, a network of music television channels owned by ProSiebenSat.1 Media
  - The Voice (Bulgaria)
  - The Voice TV Denmark, now 7'eren
  - The Voice TV Finland, now Kutonen
  - The Voice TV Norway
  - The Voice TV Sweden

=== Radio stations ===
- The Voice (radio station), a radio station in Denmark, Sweden and Bulgaria
- The Voice (North Devon), a British radio station
- The Voice of Hiphop & RnB, a Swedish radio station
- The Voice Hiphop & RnB Norway, a Norwegian radio station
- The Voice (CHOP), a radio station at Children's Hospital of Philadelphia, U.S.

== Other uses ==
- The Voice, abbreviation for the Indigenous Voice to Parliament, a proposed body to advise the Australian Government
- The vOICe, a sensory substitution system

== See also ==
- Voice (disambiguation)
- Voices (disambiguation)
- Voicing (disambiguation)
- La Voix (disambiguation)
- La Voz (disambiguation)
- "You're the Voice", 1986 hit single sung by John Farnham
