= VOZ =

VOZ may refer to:

- VOZ (media company)
- Virgin Australia airline ICAO code
- IATA airport code for Voronezh International Airport
- Voz, Omišalj, a bay and former fishing village near Omišalj on Krk, Croatia
- Mali Voz, a hamlet of Zaton Doli
- VOZ (forum)

== See also ==
- La Voz (disambiguation)
