= La Voz =

== Media ==
=== United States ===
- La Voz Magazine, a magazine
- La Voz Hispana de Virginia, a magazine
- La Voz de Houston, a newspaper
- La Voz (Phoenix), a newspaper
- La Voz, a publication in New York's Hudson Valley owned by Bard College

=== Other media ===
- La Voz del Interior, a newspaper in Córdoba, Argentina
- La Voz Dominicana, a radio station in Dominican Republic
- La Voz de Michoacán, a newspaper in Mexico
- La Voz de Galicia, a newspaper in Spain
- La Voz de Tijuana, a fictional newspaper in the Netflix TV series Narcos: Mexico

== Music ==
- A nickname for singer Felipe Rodríguez (1926–1999)
- La Voz (album), a 1975 album by Héctor Lavoe

== Television shows based on The Voice ==
- La Voz... Argentina
- La Voz Colombia
- La Voz (Mexican TV series)
- La Voz (Spanish TV series)
- La Voz (U.S. TV series)

== See also ==
- The Voice (disambiguation)
- La Voix (disambiguation)
- VOZ (disambiguation)
