= Wynne Godley =

British economist

The Honourable Wynne Godley
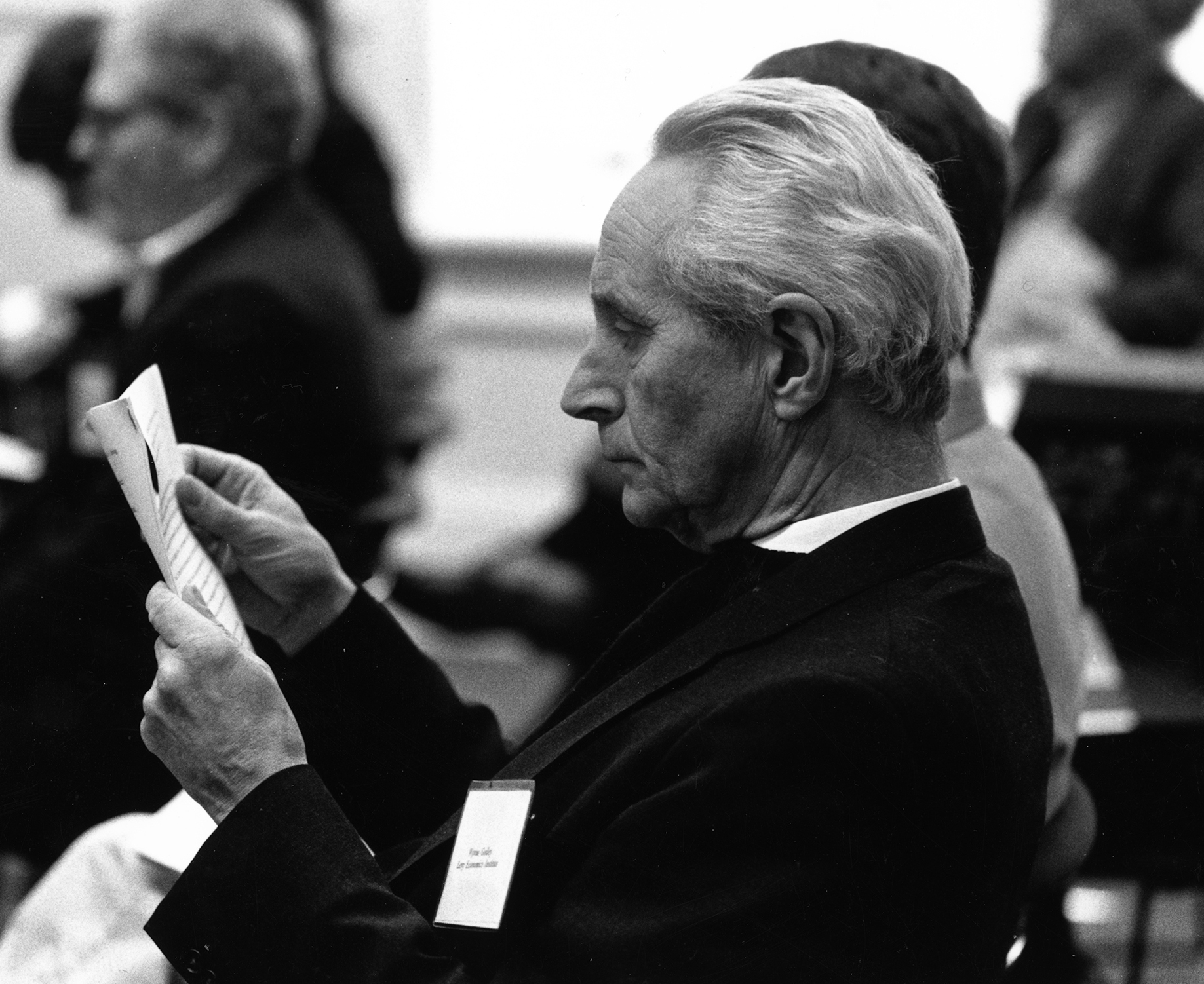
- Wynne Godley
- Born: 2 September 1926; London, England
- Died: 13 May 2010 (aged 83)
- Spouse: Kitty Garman

Academic background
- Influences: John Maynard Keynes, Nicholas Kaldor, James Tobin, Francis Cripps

Academic work
- Discipline: Monetary economics
- School or tradition: Post-Keynesian economics
- Notable ideas: Stock-Flow Consistent Modelling; Sectoral financial balances

Wynne Godley (26 September 1926 – 13 May 2010) was an economist famous for his pessimism about the British economy and his criticism of the British government. In 2007, he and Marc Lavoie wrote a book about the "Stock-Flow Consistent" model, an analysis that predicted the 2008 financial crisis. Dirk Bezemer argues that Godley was notable for predicting the nature of the Great Recession of the late 2000s well in advance, and for doing so on the basis of a formal model.

== Life ==
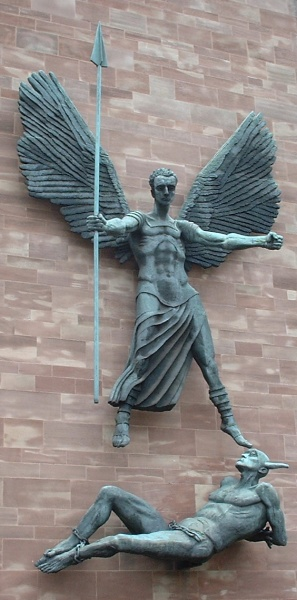
St Michael's Victory over the Devil, by Sir Jacob Epstein, the head of which was modelled on Wynne Godley

Godley was born in London, the younger son of Lord Kilbracken.

Godley attended Sandroyd School in Surrey and Rugby School, then read politics, philosophy and economics at New College, Oxford, where Isaiah Berlin and Philip Andrews, one of the main economists of the Oxford Economic Research Group, were two of his most important mentors. Godley trained to become a professional musician, studying at the Paris Conservatoire for three years, and then becoming principal oboist at the BBC Welsh Orchestra. He was however continuously nervous about performing in public, and gave up this career, although he remained interested in music and was director of the Royal Opera from 1976 to 1987. In 1955, he married Kitty Epstein, daughter of Jacob Epstein the sculptor, who used his "impossibly handsome" head as the model for his statue of St Michael at the rebuilt Coventry Cathedral.

After his musical career ended, he became an economist at the Metal Box company, and then from 1956 to 1970, he worked at the Treasury where he worked in macroeconomic policy issues and short term forecasting, bridging economic and policy issues, including the 1967 devaluation of the pound under Harold Wilson. While at the Treasury he met Nicholas Kaldor, who persuaded him to move to Cambridge University where he became a fellow of King's College and director of the department of applied economics, although he continued to work as a government economic advisor at times, and was appointed as one of Norman Lamont's 'seven wise men' external economic advisors after Black Wednesday. He predicted that the 1973–74 economic boom would end, and that unemployment would hit 3 million in the 1980s. As one of his proteges noted, these dire warnings "… earned him the title 'Cassandra of the Fens' and were derided – until they came true".

His contributions to Treasury policy thinking over the years were acknowledged by Dave Ramsden, chief economic advisor to the treasury: "In the 2000s, much of which coincided with a period of apparent and widely researched stability, what stands out is his distinctive analysis and his prescience about the looming financial and economic crisis, and the potential role for what had become by then innovative policies in responding." In 1992, he warned that without shared fiscal policy to replace currency movements there would be problems with monetary union in Europe.

In 1983, Godley published a book called Macroeconomics, co-authored with Francis Cripps.

In 1995, Godley took up a post at the Levy Economics Institute of Bard College in New York State, where his work focused on the strategic prospects for the US and world economies, and the use of accounting macroeconomic models to reveal structural imbalances. In 1998, he was one of the first to warn that the growing imbalance in the global economy, fuelled by burgeoning American private sector debt, was unsustainable. His book Monetary Economics: Integrated Approach to Money, Income, Production and Wealth (2007), written with Marc Lavoie, deals with stock-flow consistent macro modelling.

== Contribution to economics ==
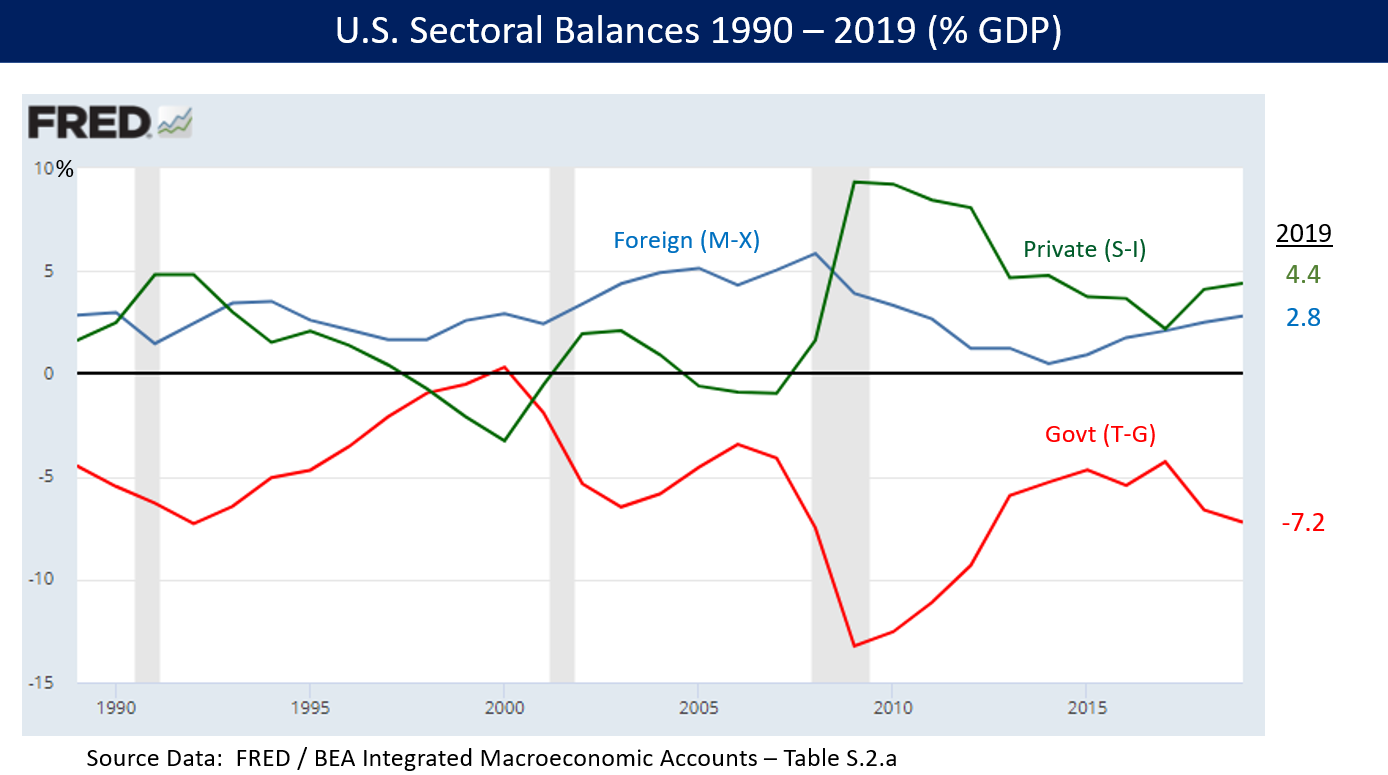
Graphic illustrating Godley's sectoral financial balances analytical framework

Economist Martin Wolf gave credit to Godley's "sectoral financial balances" analytical framework in a 2012 analysis of the Great Recession. Wolf explained: "The essential idea is that since income has to equal expenditure for the economy, as a whole, (which is the same thing as saying that savings equals investment) so the sums of the difference between income and expenditures of each of the sectors of the economy must also be zero. These differences can also be described as “financial balances”. Thus, if a sector is spending less than its income it must be accumulating (net) claims on other sectors. The crucial point is that, since sectoral balances must sum to zero, a rise in the deficit of one sector must be matched by an offsetting change in the others. It follows that if the fiscal deficit is increasing, the sum of the surpluses of the other sectors of the economy must be increasing in a precisely offsetting manner." Wolf explained that a large increase in the private sector financial balance drove a large increase in government deficits.

=== Deindustrialisation ===
Godley developed the "New Cambridge" model of deindustrialisation. It stresses the long-term Decline and competitiveness of British industry. During the 1970s especially, the manufacturing sector steadily lost its share of both home and international markets. The historic substantial surplus of exports over Imports slipped into an even balance. That balance is maintained by North Sea oil primarily, and to a lesser extent from some efficiency improvement in agriculture and service sectors. The New Cambridge model posits several different causes for the decline in competitiveness. Down to the 1970's, the model stresses bad delivery times, poor design of products, and general low-quality. The implication is that although research levels are high in Britain, industry has been laggard in implementing innovation. The model after 1979 points to the appreciation of sterling against other currencies, so that British products are more expensive. In terms of policy, the New Cambridge model recommends general import controls, or else unemployment will continue to mount. The model indicates that deindustrialization is a serious problem which threatens the nation's ability to maintain balance of payments equilibrium in the long run. The situation after North Sea oil runs out appears troublesome. Deindustrialisation imposes serious social consequences. Workers skilled in the manufacturing sector are no longer needed, and are shuffled off to lower paying, less technologically valuable jobs. Computization and globalization are compounding that problem.

=== Prediction of the Great Recession ===
Dirk Bezemer argues that Godley was notable for being one of relatively few economists to predict the nature of the Great Recession of the late 2000s well in advance, and for doing so on the basis of a formal model.

== Bibliography ==
Books

- Wynne Godley and Marc Lavoie, 2007. Monetary Economics: An Integrated Approach to Credit, Money, Income, Production and Wealth, Palgrave MacMillan. ISBN 0-230-50055-2 Description.
- Wynne Godley and T. Francis Cripps, 1983. Macroeconomics, ISBN 0-19-215358-7

Papers

- Wynne Godley and Marc Lavoie, April 2007. Fiscal Policy in a Stock-Flow Consistent (SFC) Model, Working Paper No. 494, Levy Economics Institute

Bibliographies

- Robert A. Cord, 2017. The Palgrave Companion to Cambridge Economics, pp 929–953, Palgrave MacMillan, ISBN 978-1-137-41232-4
