= Claude Lavoie Richer =

Canadian cross-country skier

Claude Lavoie Richer (December 22, 1929 – May 18, 2014) was a Canadian cross-country skier who competed in the 1950s. He finished 52nd in the 18 km event at the 1952 Winter Olympics in Oslo.
