= Voices (Judy Collins album) =

Studio album by Judy Collins
- Released: 1995
- Genre: Folk
- Length: 58:46
- Label: Wildflowers Music
- Producer: Judy Collins

Judy Collins chronology
Shameless (1995)	Voices (1995)	Christmas at the Biltmore Estate (1996)

Professional ratings
Review scores
Source	Rating
AllMusic (1995)	3.5/5 stars
AllMusic (2005)	3.5/5 stars
The Encyclopedia of Popular Music	3/5 stars

Voices is the twenty-fourth studio album by American singer-songwriter Judy Collins, released in 1995 by Wildflowers Music.

== Overview ==
The album features classic original Collins' songs in new arrangements. The very first edition of the album included a CD, a collection of sheet music and an eighty-page memoir, its chapters are devoted to songs, in which the singer not only explains the inspiration for the songs, but extrapolates to memories of her life. The album features a new song "Voices", designed to draw attention to children in the midst of wars around the world.

== Track listing ==
All tracks are written by Judy Collins.

No.	Title	Length
1.	"Since You've Asked"	2:46
2.	"My Father"	4:54
3.	"Albatross"	5:00
4.	"Weaver Song (Holly Ann)"	4:23
5.	"Secret Gardens"	6:42
6.	"Houses"	4:15
7.	"Open the Door (Song for Judith)"	3:50
8.	"Born to the Breed"	4:14
9.	"Trust Your Heart"	2:55
10.	"The Life You Dream"	5:18
11.	"The Blizzard"	6:34
12.	"Sailor's Life"	4:00
13.	"Voices"	4:06
Total length:		58:46
