= Richard Koo =

Taiwanese-American economist

Richard C. Koo
- 辜朝明
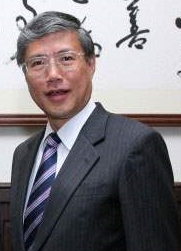
- Born: 1954 (age 71–72); Kobe, Japan
- Education: University of California, Berkeley (BA, BA); Johns Hopkins University (MA)
- Occupation: Economist
- Spouse: Chyen-Mei
- Children: 2

Richard C. Koo (Chinese: 辜朝明; pinyin: Gū Cháomíng; Japanese: リチャード・クー, IPA: [ɾitɕaːdo kɯː]; born 1954) is a Taiwanese economist specializing in balance sheet recessions. He is the chief economist at the Nomura Research Institute.

== Early life and education ==
Koo was born in Kobe, Japan. His father, Koo Kwang-ming, was an activist in the Taiwan independence movement then living in exile in Japan, and the brother of the prominent Taiwanese businessman Koo Chen-fu.

Koo lived in Tokyo for 13 years in his youth, and later attended the University of California, Berkeley, where he earned two Bachelor of Arts degrees in political science and government, respectively, in 1976. He then earned a Master of Arts in economics from Johns Hopkins University in 1981.

== Career ==
Upon graduation from Johns Hopkins University, Koo worked at the Federal Reserve Bank of New York as an economist from 1981 to 1984.

He then joined Nomura Holdings in 1984 as its first expatriate researcher and a senior economist from 1984 to 1997. He later became the chief economist at Nomura Research Institute starting in 1997.

Landon Thomas wrote about Koo's analysis in late 2011 in The New York Times, saying that Koo's 2011 "causes, cure, and politics" publication "has gone viral on the Web". Thomas was discussing the divergence between the way the U.S. and British governments addressed the 2008 financial crisis and measures by European governments during the European debt crisis.

== Publications ==
- (2003) Balance Sheet Recession: Japan’s Struggle with Uncharted Economics and Its Global Implications (John Wiley & Sons)
- (2008) The Holy Grail of Macroeconomics - Lessons from Japan's Great Recession (John Wiley & Sons)
- (2011) "The world in balance sheet recession: causes, cure, and politics", Real-World Economics Review (issue no. 58), Nomura Research Institute, Tokyo.
- (2014) The Escape from Balance Sheet Recession and the QE Trap: A Hazardous Road for the World Economy (John Wiley & Sons)
