= Monetary Financial Institutions =

Monetary Financial Institutions (MFIs), as in a definition provided by the European Central Bank, are defined as central banks, resident credit institutions as defined in Community Law, and other resident financial institutions whose business is to take deposits or close substitutes for deposits from entities other than MFIs and, for their own account (at least in economic terms), to grant credits or make investments in securities. Money market funds are also classified as MFIs.
