= La voce (song) =

Promotional single by Laura Pausini

from the album Le cose che vivi
- Released: 1997
- Recorded: 1996
- Genre: Pop
- Length: 4:55
- Songwriters: Cheope and Fabrizio Pausini

La voce ("The Voice") is a song recorded by Italian singer Laura Pausini, for her third studio album, Le cose che vivi, released in September 1996. It was the sixth and final single of the album.

The song was written by Cheope and Fabrizio Pausini, Laura's father. A Spanish-language version, titled "La voz" was recorded and included on the Spanish version of "Le cose che vivi", "Las cosas que vives".

Both versions of the song were performed during the "World Wide Tour 1997", but since such concerts of this tour didn't spawn any DVD, no live recording has been ever released. However, Pausini promoted the album with a performance on the TV show 105 Night Express, which included this and other songs.

Due to the song not being released physically as CD-Singles, no music video was made.

== Tracks ==
CDS - Promo Warner Music Italy

1. La voce

CDS - Promo Warner Music Spain

1. La voz

Digital download

1. La voce
2. La voz
