= Voce (choir) =

Voce, Inc. is a chamber choir based in Hartford, Connecticut. Founded in 2006, Voce donates much of its concert and recording proceeds to charity, in accordance with its philanthropic mission.

In 2008, National Medal of Arts recipient Morten Lauridsen collaborated with the choir to create a recording of his choral works. The recording, Sure On This Shining Night, was released in June, 2010, and had its world radio premiere on KUSC on July 8, 2010.
