= Marc Lavoie =

Canadian economist

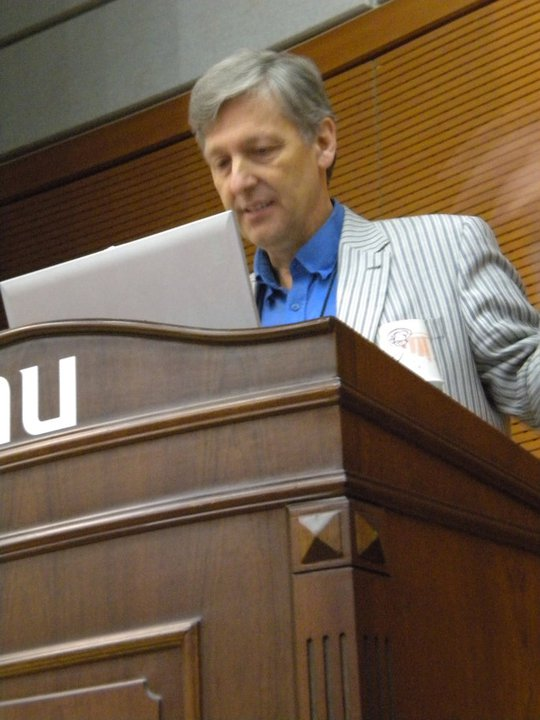
- Born: 1954 (age 71–72); Ottawa, Ontario, Canada

Academic background
- Education: Carleton University
- Influences: John Maynard Keynes, Michał Kalecki, Nicholas Kaldor, Joan Robinson, Richard Kahn, Wynne Godley

Academic work
- Discipline: Economics
- School or tradition: Post-Keynesian economics
- Institutions: Professor at the University of Ottawa
- Notable ideas: Economic growth, Structural change, Monetary economics, National accounting, Economics of Ice Hockey
- Website: Information at IDEAS / RePEc

Notes
- Editorial duties: Cambridge Journal of Economics, Journal of Post Keynesian Economics, Kyklos, Structural Change and Economic Dynamics

Marc Lavoie (born 1954) is a Canadian professor in economics at the University of Ottawa and a former Olympic fencing athlete.

== Academic career ==
Born in Ottawa, Ontario, Canada, Marc Lavoie is a professor in the Department of Economics at the University of Ottawa, where he started teaching in 1979. He got his doctorate from the University of Paris-1. Besides having published nearly two hundred articles in refereed journals, he has written a number of books, among which are Post-Keynesian Economics: New Foundations (2014), Introduction to Post-Keynesian Economics (2006), translated into four languages, Foundations of Post-Keynesian Economic Analysis (1992), as well as Monetary Economics: An Integrated Approach to Money, Income, Production and Wealth (2007) with Wynne Godley. The latter deals with and employs in its analysis the stock/flow consistent method.

With Mario Seccareccia, he has been the co-editor of three books, including one on the works of Milton Friedman, in addition to writing the first Canadian edition of the Baumol and Blinder first-year textbook (2009).

Lavoie has been the associate editor of the Encyclopedia of Political Economy (1999), and he has been a visiting professor at the universities of Bordeaux, Nice, Rennes, Dijon, Grenoble, Limoges, Lille, Paris-1 and Paris-Nord, as well as Curtin University in Perth, Australia.

Lavoie is also an IMK Research Fellow at the Hans Böckler Foundation in Düsselforf and Policy Fellow at the Broadbent Institute in Toronto. He has lectured at post-Keynesian summer schools in Kansas City, the Levy Economics Institute and Berlin.

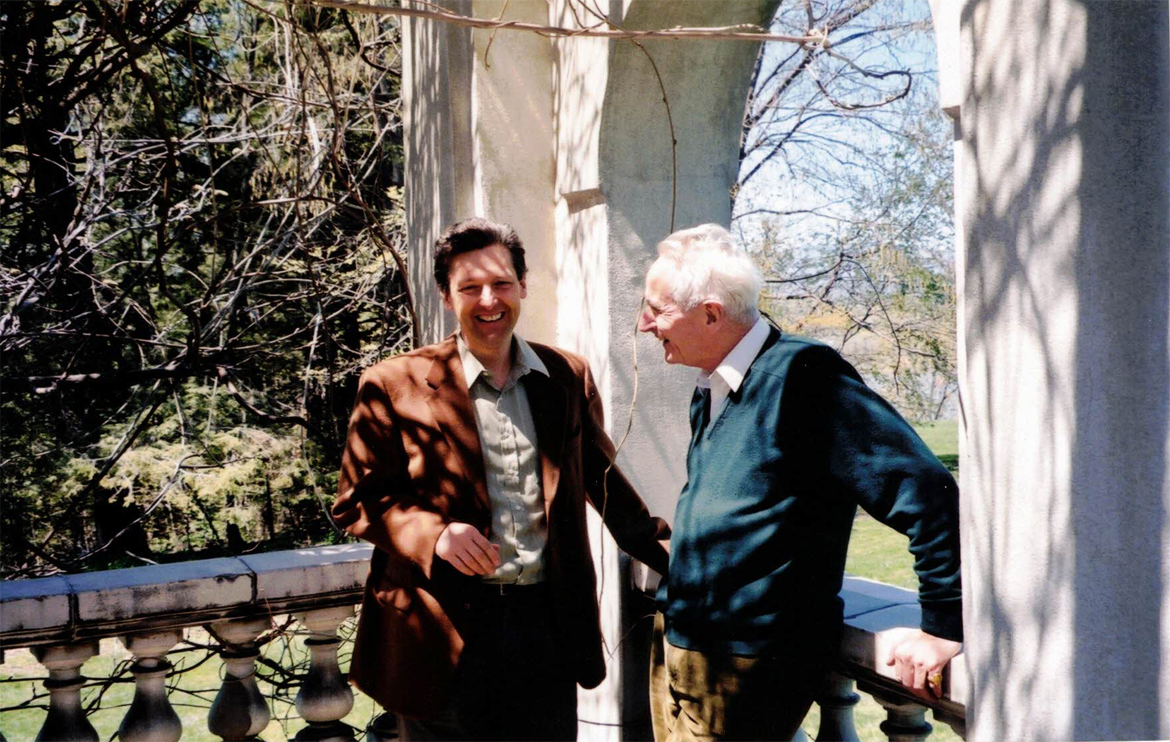
Marc Lavoie and fellow post-keynesian economist Wynne Godley (2002)

=== Research interests ===
- Heterodox economic theories
- Post-Keynesian theory
- Growth
- Macroeconomic theory
- Monetary theory and policy
- Economics of sports (discrimination, ice hockey)

== Athletic career ==
Lavoie won the Canadian national senior championship in sabre seven times, in 1975–1979 and 1985–1986. He also won the Canadian national junior championship twice, in 1973–1974, and was second at the under-15 French championships in 1969. He was on the Canadian national team from 1973 to 1984. He participated in the 1975, 1979 and 1983 Pan-American Games finishing fourth in the individual event in sabre in 1979. He also participated in the Commonwealth championships in 1974 (4th), 1978 (2nd) and 1982, and competed at the 1976 and 1984 Summer Olympics. Having been named Carleton University's Male Athlete of the Year in 1973-74 and again in 1974–75, on October 16, 2014, Lavoie was inducted into Carleton University's Athletic Hall of Fame He had previously been inducted into the Hall of Fame of the Fédération d’escrime du Québec.

=== Los Angeles (1984) ===
- 7th – Team Men's Sabre

=== Montreal (1976) ===
- 30th – Individual Men's Sabre
- 9th – Team Men's Sabre

== Books ==
- M. Lavoie, Virginie Monvoisin and Jean-François Ponsot, L'économie post-keynésienne, Devoucerte-La, 2021, 127 pp. ISBN 978-2-348-06779-2
- M. Lavoie, Post-Keynesian Monetary Theory: Selected Essays, Edward Elgar, 2020, 416 pp. ISBN 978-1-83910-009-3
- M. Lavoie, Post-Keynesian Economics: New Foundations, Cheltenham, Edward Elgar, 2014, 660 pp. ISBN 978-1-84720-483-7
- Wynne Godley and Marc Lavoie, 2007. Monetary Economics: An Integrated Approach to Credit, Money, Income, Production and Wealth, Palgrave MacMillan. ISBN 0-230-50055-2 Description.
- W.J. Baumol, A.S. Blinder, M. Lavoie and M. Seccareccia, Macroeconomics: Principles and Policy, Toronto, Nelson Education, 2009, 440 pp. ISBN 978-0-17-625255-7
- W.J. Baumol, A.S. Blinder, M. Lavoie and M. Seccareccia, Microeconomics: Principles and Policy, Toronto, Nelson Education, 2009, 495 pp. ISBN 978-0-17-625254-0
- M. Lavoie, Introduction to Post-Keynesian Economics, Palgrave/Macmillan, 2006, 150 pp. ISBN 0-230-22921-2
- M. Lavoie, La économia postkeynesiana, Barcelona, Icaria editorial, 2005, 142 pp. ISBN 84-7426-785-4 (in Spanish)
- M. Lavoie, L’Économie postkeynésienne, Paris, La Découverte (Repères), 2004, 128 pp. ISBN 978-2-7071-4266-5 (in French)
- M. Lavoie, Avantage numérique, Gatineau, Vents d'Ouest, 1997, 288 pp. ISBN 9782921603591 (in French)
- M. Lavoie, Désavantage numérique, Gatineau, Vents d'Ouest, 1998, 168 pp. ISBN 9782921603652 (in French)
- M. Lavoie, Macroéconomie: théorie et controverses postkeynésiennes, Dunod, Paris, 1987, 225 pp. ISBN 2-04-016-904-0 (in French)
- F. S. Lee and M. Lavoie (eds), In Defense of Post-Keynesian Economics and Heterodox Economics: Response to their Critics, Routledge, London, 2013, 260 pp. ISBN 978-0-415-69436-0
- M. Lavoie and E. Stockhammer (eds), Wage-Led Growth: An Equitable Strategy for Economic Recovery, International Labour Office - Palgrave Macmillan, Basingstoke, 2013, 193 pp. ISBN 978-1-137-35792-2
- M. Lavoie and G. Zezza (eds), The Stock-Flow Consistent Approach: Selected Writings of Wynne Godley, Palgrave Macmillan, Basingstoke, 2012, 276 pp. ISBN 978-0-230-29311-3
- L.P. Rochon, M. Lavoie and M. Seccareccia (eds), Money and Macroeconomic Issues: Alfred Eichner and Post-Keynesian Economics, M.E. Sharpe, Armonk (NJ), 2010, 250 pp. ISBN 978-0-7656-1796-5
- M. Lavoie and M. Seccareccia, Central Banking in the Modern World: Alternative Perspectives, Edward Elgar, Cheltenham, 2004, 296 pp. ISBN 1-84376-641-8
- M. Lavoie et M. Seccareccia (dir.), Milton Friedman et son oeuvre, Presses de l'Université de Montréal, Montréal, 1993, 230 pp. ISBN 2-7606-1586-3 (in French)

== See also ==
- Luigi Pasinetti
- Hyman Minsky
- Wynne Godley
