= Voce (surname) =

Voce is a surname. Notable people with the surname include:

- Amy Voce, English radio presenter
- Bill Voce (1909–1984), English cricketer
- Gary Voce (born 1965), American NBA player
- John Voce (born 1963), English actor
- Lello Voce (born 1957), Italian poet
- Luna Voce (born 1988), Dutch-Italian model
- Maria Voce (1937–2025), Italian lawyer and president of the Focolare Movement
- Regina Voce, Mexican drag queen and singer
- Steve Voce (1933–2023), British journalist
- Tony Voce (1980–2024), American ice hockey player
- Vincenzo Voce (born 1962), Italian politician
