= Flow of funds =

Flow of funds accounts are a system of interrelated balance sheets for a nation, calculated periodically. There are two types of balance sheets: those showing

- The aggregate assets and liabilities for financial and nonfinancial sectors, and
- What sectors issue and hold financial assets (instruments) of a given type.

The sectors and instruments are listed below.

These balance sheets measure levels of assets and liabilities. From each balance sheet a corresponding flows statement can be derived by subtracting the levels data for the preceding period from the data for the current period. (In the statistical analysis of time series, this operation is known as "first differencing.") The change in a level item between two adjacent periods is known as a "fund flow"; hence the name for these accounts.

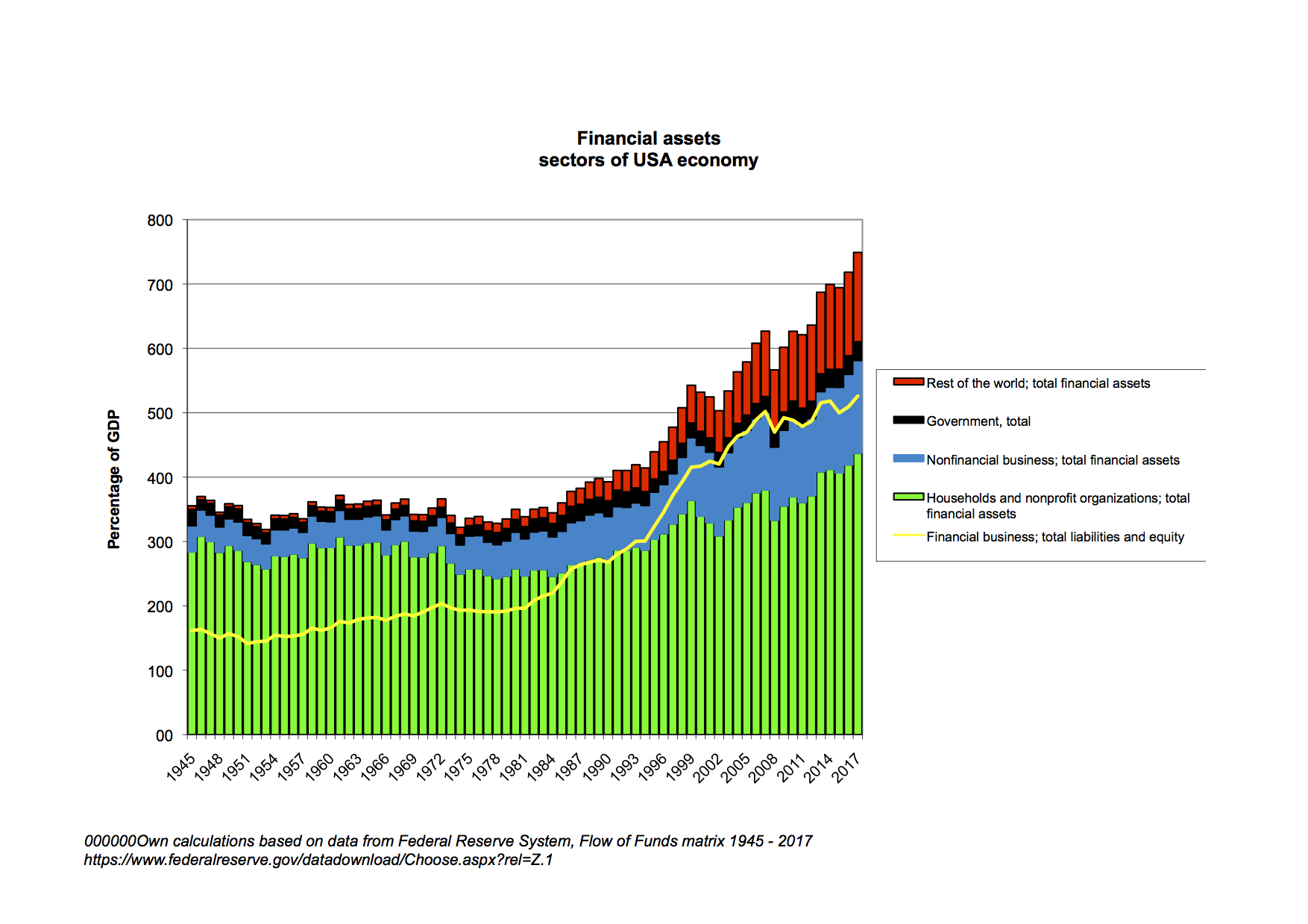
Financial assets of broad sectors of USA economy, 1945–2017. Source: Federal Reserve System, flow of funds data.

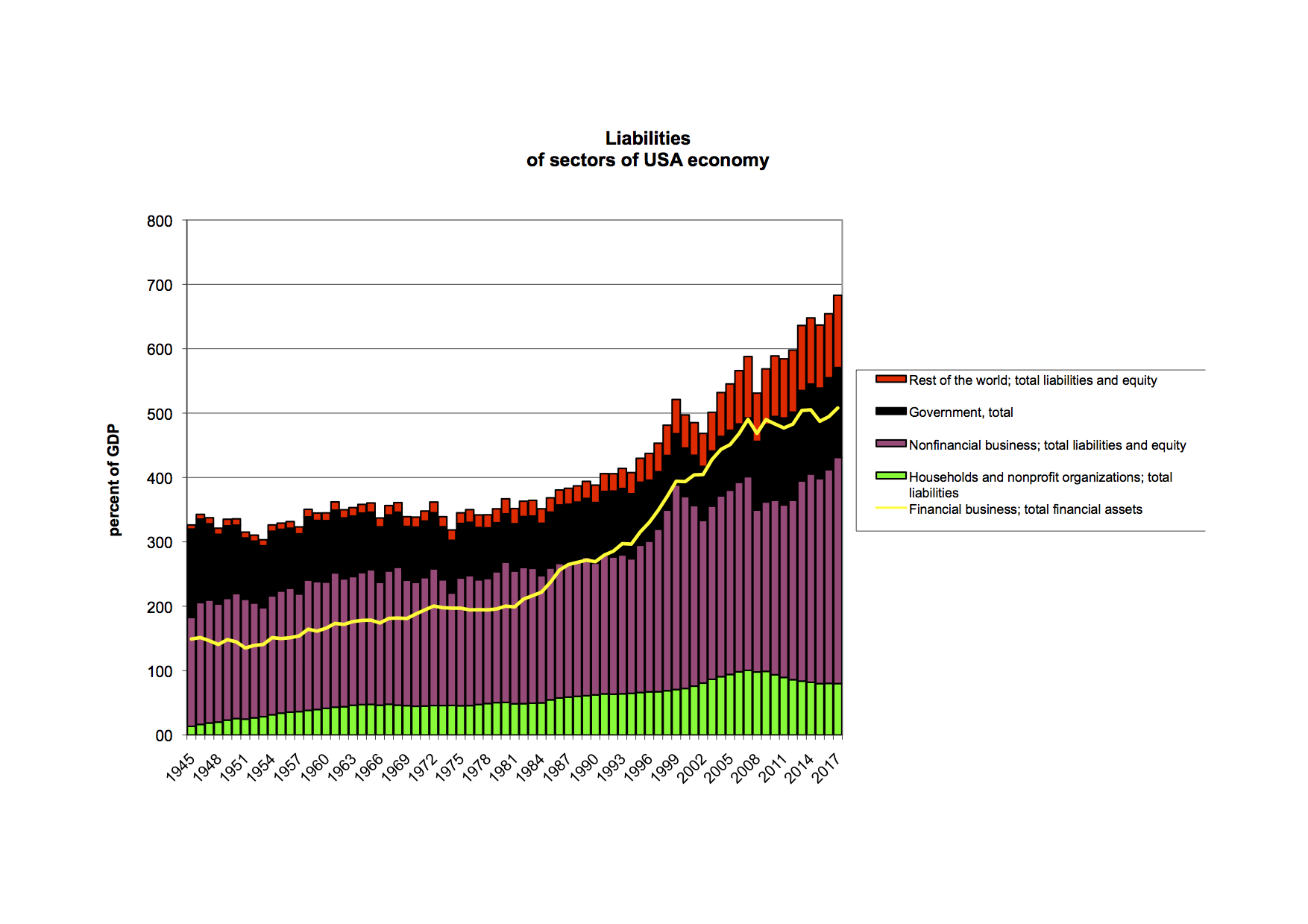
Liabilities of broad sectors of USA economy, 1945–2017. Source: Federal Reserve System, flow of funds data.

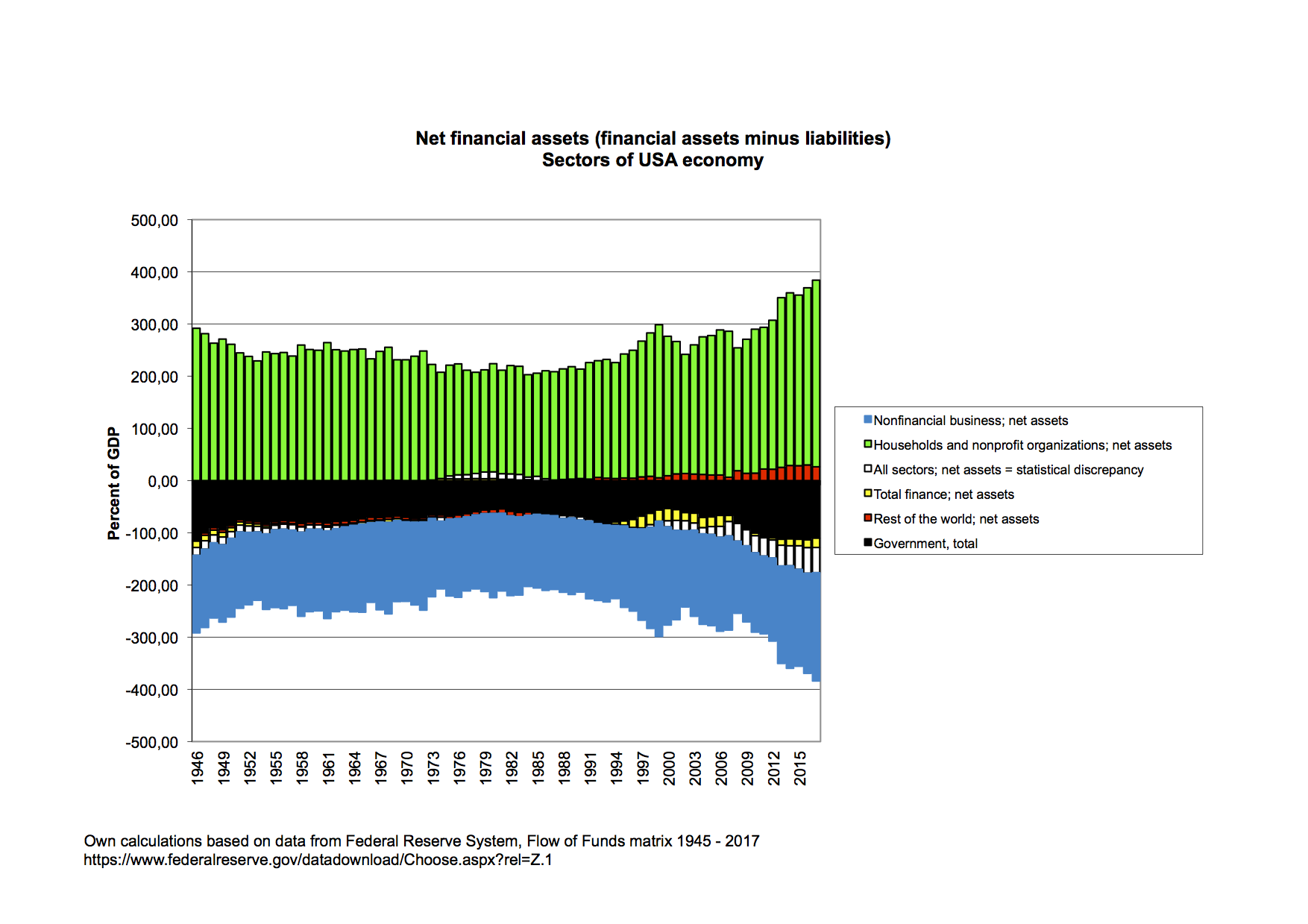
Financial net worth of broad sectors of USA economy, 1945–2017. Source: Federal Reserve System, flow of funds data.

== Main topics covered in the FF accounts ==
- Total debt broken down by issuer and holder
- Connection to national accounts, and derivation of measures of aggregate saving
- Fund flows originating in each sector
- Levels:
  - Assets and liabilities for broad sectors and for specific financial sectors
  - Sectors issuing and holding instruments of a given class
- Miscellaneous aggregate financial data

== Organization of the flow of funds accounts of the US ==
The flow of funds (FOF) accounts of the United States are prepared by the Flow of Funds section of the Board of Governors of the Federal Reserve System and are published quarterly in a publication called the Z.1 Statistical Release. Current and historical releases available in PDF, CSV, or XML format. Data frequency is annual from yearend 1945 and quarterly beginning in 1952Q1. Detailed interactive documentation is also available.

The flow of funds accounts follow naturally from double-entry bookkeeping; every financial asset is also a liability of some domestic or foreign human entity. A fundamental fact about any economic sector is its balance sheet, a breakdown of its physical and financial assets, and of its liabilities. The only physical assets noted in the FF accounts are those of private nonfinancial sectors.

=== Broad structure of the US economy ===
Nonfinancial sectors:

- Households and nonprofit organizations
- Nonfinancial firms
  - Corporations, farms excepted
  - Unincorporated firms, farms excepted
  - Farms
- Government
  - Federal
  - State & local
- Rest of the world (foreign sector)

Financial sector:

- Firms
- Instruments

=== Firms ===
- Federal Reserve System
- Depository institutions:
  - US chartered commercial banks
  - Branch offices of foreign banks
  - Bank holding companies
  - Banks in US possessions
  - Thrifts
  - Credit unions
- Property-casualty insurance
- Life insurance
- Pension funds:
  - Federal government
  - State & local government
  - Private employers
- Money market funds
- Other open-ended mutual funds
- Exchange-traded funds & closed-end funds
- Government-sponsored enterprises (GSEs)
- Federal mortgage pools
- Issuers of asset-backed securities
- Finance companies
- Real estate investment trusts
- Security brokers & dealers
- Funding corporations

=== Instruments (asset types) ===
- Official reserve assets
- Treasury currency and SDRs
- American-owned deposits in other countries
- Net interbank transactions
- Checkable deposits & Fed currency
- Time & savings deposits
- Money market fund shares
- Federal funds & Repos
- Privately issued short-term paper
- Treasury securities
- Agency & GSE-backed securities
- Municipal bonds & related debt
- Corporate & foreign bonds
- Corporate equities
- Mutual fund shares
- Mortgages:
  - Home (single family residence)
  - Multifamily residence
  - Commercial
  - Farm
- Consumer credit
- Other bank loans
- Trade credit
- Security credit
- Other loans & advances
- Reserves of life insurance companies & pension funds
- Taxes payable
- Proprietors' equity in unincorporated firms
- Miscellaneous financial assets

== Organisation of the flow of funds accounts of the UK ==
The UK flow of funds accounts are prepared by the Office for National Statistics in a series of matrices. The first tables will be published in Blue Book 2014, to be released in September 2014. They contain the sectors and instruments shown below:

=== Sectors ===
- Public Corporations
- Private non-Financial Corporations
- Monetary Financial Institutions
- Other Financial Institutions
- Insurance Corporations and Pension Funds
- Central Government
- Local Government
- Households and NPISH
- UK total economy
- Rest of the World

=== Financial Instruments ===
Monetary Gold and Special Drawing Rights

Currency and Deposits

- Currency
- Transferable Deposits
  - With UK MFIs
  - With Rest of the World MFIs
- Other deposits

Debt securities

- Short term debt securities issued
  - by UK Central Government
  - by UK Local Government
  - by UK MFIs
  - MMIs by other UK residents
  - MMIs by rest of the world
- Long term debt securities issued
  - by UK Central Government
  - by UK Local Government
  - Medium term bonds by UK MFIs
  - Medium and long-term bonds by other UK residents
  - Long term bonds by rest of the world

Loans

- Short-term loans
  - by UK MFIs
  - by ROW MFIs
- Long-term loans
  - Direct Investment loans
  - Secured on dwellings
  - Finance leasing
  - Other long-term loans by UK residents
  - Other long-term loans by rest of the world

Equity and investment fund shares/units

- Shares and other equity, excluding mutual funds shares
  - Listed UK shares
  - Unlisted UK shares
  - Other UK equity
  - UK shares and bonds issued by other UK residents
  - Shares and other equity issued by the rest of the world
- Investment fund shares/units
  - UK investment funds' shares
  - Rest of the world mutual funds' shares

Insurance technical reserves

- Non-life insurance technical reserves
- Life insurance and annuity entitlements
- Pension schemes
- Provisions for calls under standardised guarantees

Financial derivates and employee stock options

- of which; Financial Derivatives

Other accounts payable / receivable

== See also ==
- National accounts
