= Sectoral analysis =

Statistical technique

Sectoral analysis, also known as sectorial analysis, is a statistical analysis of the size, demographic, pricing, competitive, and other economic dimensions of a sector of the economy. The analysis can be done by industry or by customer designation. The method was further developed by Wynne Godley for use in macroeconomic analysis of national economies.
