= Voicing =

Voicing may refer to:

- Voicing (music), the distribution of a chord's notes, either in composition or orchestration
- The regulation of tone and loudness of an instrument's notes:
  - Piano maintenance § Voicing
  - Voicing (pipe organ)
  - Plectrum § Voicing harpsichord plectra
- Voice (phonetics), in phonetics and phonology
  - Consonant voicing and devoicing

== See also ==
- Voice (disambiguation)
  - Human voice
  - Voice (music)
- Voice acting
- Voicings, a 1986 album by Rio Nido
