= La Voz Hispana de Virginia =

La Voz Hispana de Virginia magazine is the only Hispanic magazine in the U.S. state of Virginia and was recognized in 2005 as the "best Latino publication in the state" by Governor Mark Warner. Varied topics of interest are covered in both English and Spanish from cultural, arts, and music events to community news. The magazine is headquartered in Richmond, Virginia and is published monthly.
