= La Voix de l'Est (Bagnolet) =

French newspaper

- La Voix de l'Est, 30 December 1954 issue
- Type: Weekly
- Founded: 1932
- Political alignment: Communist
- Language: French language
- Headquarters: 13, rue Marceau, Bagnolet 48°52′5.1″N 2°25′2.2″E
- Circulation: 12,100 (1937)

La Voix de l'Est (French pronunciation: [la vwa də lɛst], The Voice of the East) was a French Communist Party local weekly newspaper published from Bagnolet, France. The newspaper was founded in 1932. In 1935, it had a circulation of 8,000 and by 1937 the circulation had reached 12,1000. In the mid-1930s Coudert, the mayor of Bagnolet, was the director of the newspaper.

La Voix de l'Est continued publication after the Second World War.
