= List of Post-Keynesian economists =

Economists who describe themselves or are described as Post-Keynesian include:

- Philip Arestis
- Athanasios Asimakopulos
- Dean Baker
- Terry Barker
- Paul Davidson
- Evsey Domar
- Alfred Eichner
- James K. Galbraith
- Wynne Godley
- Augusto Graziani
- Geoff Harcourt
- Donald J. Harris
- Michael Hudson
- Nicholas Kaldor
- Michał Kalecki
- Steve Keen
- Stephanie Kelton
- Jan Kregel
- Marc Lavoie
- Frederic S. Lee
- Paolo Leon
- Abba P. Lerner
- Geoffrey Maynard
- Hyman Minsky
- William Francis "Bill" Mitchell
- Basil Moore
- Warren Mosler
- Tracy Mott
- Thomas Palley
- Lars Pålsson Syll
- Luigi Pasinetti
- Joan Robinson
- G. L. S. Shackle
- Robert Skidelsky
- Piero Sraffa
- Anthony Thirlwall
- William Vickrey
- Sidney Weintraub
- Randall Wray
- Riccardo Bellofiore
