= Victoria Chick =

American economist (1936–2023)

- Born: 8 April 1936; Berkeley, California, U.S.
- Died: 15 January 2023 (aged 86); London, England

Academic background
- Influences: John Maynard Keynes, Hyman Minsky

Academic work
- Discipline: Macroeconomics and monetary economics
- School or tradition: Post Keynesian economics
- Notable ideas: Post Keynesian economics
- Website: Information at IDEAS / RePEc

Victoria Chick (April 8, 1936 – January 15, 2023) was a post-Keynesian economist known for her essays on monetary theory, banking and methodology. Her writing on Keynes's General Theory made her one of the foremost interpreters of his work. After the 2008 financial crisis, she coined a corollary to Gresham's law, arguing that in orthodox economics "bad theory drives out good."

== Early life ==
Chick was born in Berkeley, California, in 1936. She had originally planned to study STEM subjects but found that "[science] was so sexist, a woman just could not survive – they hounded you out." Instead she graduated from the University of California, Berkeley, with bachelor's and master's degrees in economics.

== Biography ==
Chick wrote her thesis on Canada's experience in the 1950s with flexible exchange rates. As a research student, she was taught by Hyman Minsky among others, although her interest in Keynes and his General Theory developed much later. Minsky "did attempt to teach me the General Theory...but I didn't really see the point at the time," she later said. However, she was "indelibly" impressed by Minsky's "skill at blending theory and institutional facts."

After further study at the London School of Economics, in 1963 she secured a post at University College London where she remained for the rest of her career, being appointed to a chair in 1993. At UCL her interests shifted from international economics to monetary theory and macroeconomics. Her first major book, The Theory of Monetary Policy (1973), was a critical evaluation of both the Keynesian and monetarist approaches to macroeconomics that were dominant of the time. In 1971 she was present at Joan Robinson's Ely Lecture to the American Economic Association, titled The Second Crisis in Economics, and at the meeting called by Joan Robinson and Paul Davidson which gave conscious expression to what became the post-Keynesian school of thought.

Chick then returned to The General Theory and wrote a critique of Clower and Leijonhufvud's reappraisal (Leijonhufvud, 1968) of the Economics of Keynes, leading eventually to her magnum opus Macroeconomics After Keynes (1983). In this book she portrayed the Keynesian Revolution as one of method, forced by taking seriously the effects of money, time and uncertainty. Her subsequent work has placed great emphasis on methodology and institutions.

In 1988, with Philip Arestis, Chick founded the Post Keynesian Economics Study Group (PKSG).

In 2014, Routledge published a two-volume Festschrift titled Money, Macroeconomics and Keynes: Essays in Honour of Victoria Chick, Volume 1, and Methodology, Microeconomics and Keynes: Essays in Honour of Victoria Chick, Volume 2, edited by Philip Arestis, Meghnad Desai and Sheila Dow.

Chick died in London on January 15, 2023, at the age of 86.

== Major works ==
- The Theory of Monetary Policy Oxford: Basil Blackwell (1977)
- Macroeconomics After Keynes Cambridge, Massachusetts: MIT Press (1983)

== See also ==
- List of economists
- Macroeconomics
