= Finance capitalism =

Economic system that prioritizes accumulation of money and securities over production

A 400-year evolution of modern financial capitalism

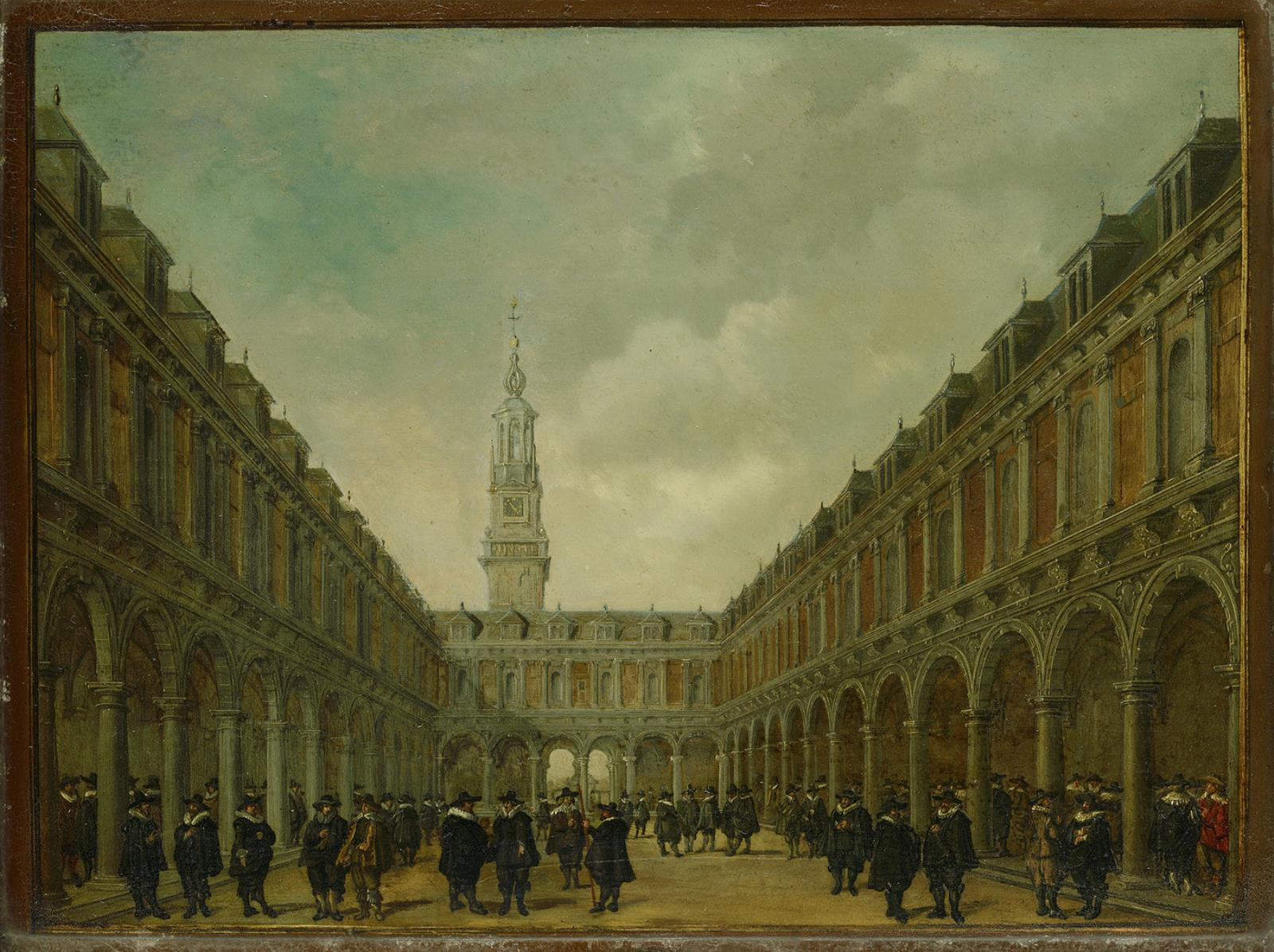
Courtyard of the Amsterdam Stock Exchange (or Beurs van Hendrick de Keyser in Dutch), a powerhouse of Dutch capitalism in the 1600s. The birth of the world's first formally listed public company (the Dutch East India Company) and first formal stock exchange (the Amsterdam Stock Exchange), in the 17th-century Dutch Republic, helped usher in a new era of finance capitalism.

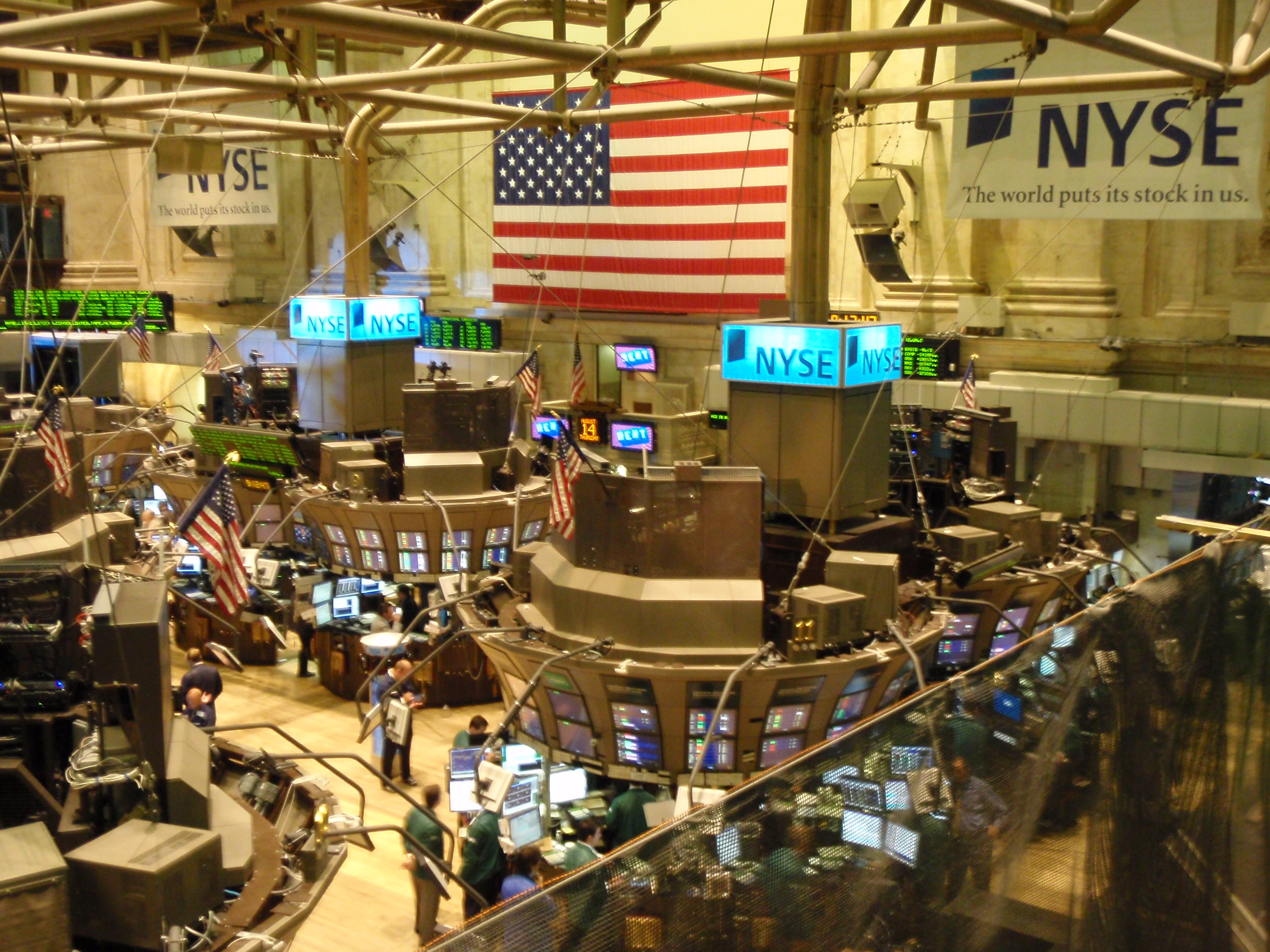
The trading floor of the New York Stock Exchange (NYSE), a foremost symbol of American finance capitalism, in the early 21st century

Finance capitalism or financial capitalism is a form of capitalism that emphasises the pursuit of profits through financial services and the trading of financial products instead of the production and sale of goods and services. It has been referred to as "profiting without producing".

Under financial capitalism, the financial sector's management of savings and control over investment becomes a dominant function in the economy, with wider implications for the political process and social evolution. The process of developing this kind of economy is called financialization.

== Characteristics ==
Finance capitalism is characterized by a predominance of the pursuit of profit from the purchase and sale of, or investment in, currencies and financial products such as bonds, stocks, futures and other derivatives. It also includes the lending of money at interest; and is seen by Marxist analysts (from whom the term finance capitalism originally derived) as being exploitative by supplying income to non-laborers, summarised by Lapavitsas as "profiting without producing". Academic defenders of the economic concept of capitalism, such as Eugen von Böhm-Bawerk, see such profits as part of the roundabout process by which capitalist economies grow and hedge against inevitable risks.

In financial capitalism, financial intermediaries become large concerns, ranging from banks to investment firms. While deposit banks attract savings and lend out money, and investment banks obtain funds on the interbank market to re-lend for investment purposes, investment firms, by comparison, act on behalf of other concerns, by selling their equities or securities to investors, for investment purposes.

=== Social implications ===
The meaning of the term financial capitalism goes beyond the importance of financial intermediation in the modern capitalist economy. It also encompasses the significant influence of the wealth holders on the political process and the aims of economic policy.

Thomas Palley has argued that the 21st century predominance of finance capital has led to a preference for speculation—Casino Capitalism—over investment for entrepreneurial growth in the global economy.

Marie Gottschalk writes the increased financialization of the economy has "facilitated an astounding upward redistribution of wealth and political power."

== Historical developments ==
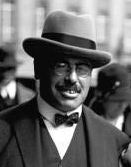
Rudolf Hilferding is credited with first bringing the term finance capitalism into prominence.

Rudolf Hilferding is credited with first bringing the term finance capitalism into prominence, with his (1910) study of the links between German trusts, banks, and monopolies before World War I. Hilferding's Finance Capital (Das Finanzkapital, Vienna: 1910) was "the seminal Marxist analysis of the transformation of competitive and pluralistic 'liberal capitalism' into monopolistic 'finance capital'", and anticipated Lenin's and Bukharin's "largely derivative" writings on the subject. Writing in the context of the highly cartelized economy of late Austria-Hungary, Hilferding contrasted monopolistic finance capitalism to the earlier, "competitive" and "buccaneering" capitalism of the earlier liberal era. The unification of industrial, mercantile and banking interests had defused the earlier liberal capitalist demands for the reduction of the economic role of a mercantilist state; instead, finance capital sought a "centralized and privilege-dispensing state". Hilferding saw this as part of the inevitable concentration of capital called for by Marxian economics, rather than a deviation from the free market.

Whereas, until the 1860s, the demands of capital and of the bourgeoisie had been, in Hilferding's view, constitutional demands that had "affected all citizens alike", finance capital increasingly sought state intervention on behalf of the wealth-owning classes; capitalists, rather than the nobility, now dominated the state.

In this, Hilferding saw an opportunity for a path to socialism that was distinct from the one foreseen by Marx: "The socializing function of finance capital facilitates enormously the task of overcoming capitalism. Once finance capital has brought the most importance (sic) branches of production under its control, it is enough for society, through its conscious executive organ – the state conquered by the working class – to seize finance capital to gain immediate control of these branches of production." This would make it unnecessary to expropriate "peasant farms and small businesses" because they would be indirectly socialized, through the socialization of institutions upon which finance capital had already made them dependent. Thus, because a narrow class dominated the economy, socialist revolution could gain wider support by directly expropriating only from that narrow class. In particular, according to Hilferding, societies that had not reached the level of economic maturity anticipated by Marx as making them "ripe" for socialism could be opened to socialist possibilities. Furthermore, "the policy of finance capital is bound to lead towards war, and hence to the unleashing of revolutionary storms."

John A Hobson, a British economist, contributed to the understanding of finance capitalism in Imperialism (1902). His work influenced Lenin's Imperialism: The highest stage of capitalism (1916).

Hilferding's study was subsumed by Lenin into his wartime analysis of the imperialist relations of the great world powers. Lenin concluded of the banks at that time that they were "the chief nerve centres of the whole capitalist system of national economy": for the Comintern, the phrase "dictatorship of finance capitalism" became a regular one.

In such a traditional Marxist perspective, finance capitalism is seen as a dialectical outgrowth of industrial capitalism, and part of the process by which the whole capitalist phase of history comes to an end. In a fashion similar to the views of Thorstein Veblen, finance capitalism is contrasted with industrial capitalism, where profit is made from the manufacture of goods.

Fernand Braudel would later point to two earlier periods when finance capitalism had emerged in human history—with the Genoese in the 16th century and the Dutch in the 17th and 18th centuries—although at those points it was from commercial capitalism that it developed. Giovanni Arrighi extended Braudel's analysis to suggest that a predominance of finance capitalism is a recurring, long-term phenomenon, whenever a previous phase of commercial/industrial capitalist expansion reaches a plateau.

Whereas by mid-century the industrial corporation had displaced the banking system as the prime economic symbol of success, the late twentieth-century growth of derivatives and of a novel banking model ushered in a new (and historically fourth) period of finance capitalism.

Fredric Jameson has seen the globalised abstractions of this current phase of financial capitalism as underpinning the cultural manifestations of postmodernism.

== See also ==
- Corporatism
- Economics of fascism
- Financialization
- Financial capital
- Financial Instability Hypothesis
- Late capitalism
- Late modernity
- Post-Fordism
- Speculation
