= Sheila Dow =

British economist

Sheila Dow is a post-Keynesian economist. She was a Professor (and is an Emeritus Professor) of Economics at the University of Stirling in Scotland. She has published in a wide range of areas, most notably in economic methodology, the endogeneity of money and the history of economic thought.

== Selected publications ==
- Dow, S. C. (1996). The methodology of macroeconomic thought.Edward Elgar
- Dow, S. C. (1996). Horizontalism: a critique. Cambridge Journal of Economics, 20(4), 497–508.
- Chick, V. and Dow, S.C. (1988) A post-Keynesian perspective on the relation between banking and regional development. In P. Arestis (ed.) Post-Keynesian Monetary Economics—New Approaches to Financial Modelling. Aldershot: Elgar, 219–250
