= James Crotty =

James Crotty may refer to:

- James Crotty (economist) (born 1940), American economist
- James Crotty (prospector) (1845–1898), Irish-born mining prospector in Tasmania
- Jim Crotty (1938–2021), American football cornerback
