= Thomas Palley =

American economist (born 1956)

Thomas I. Palley
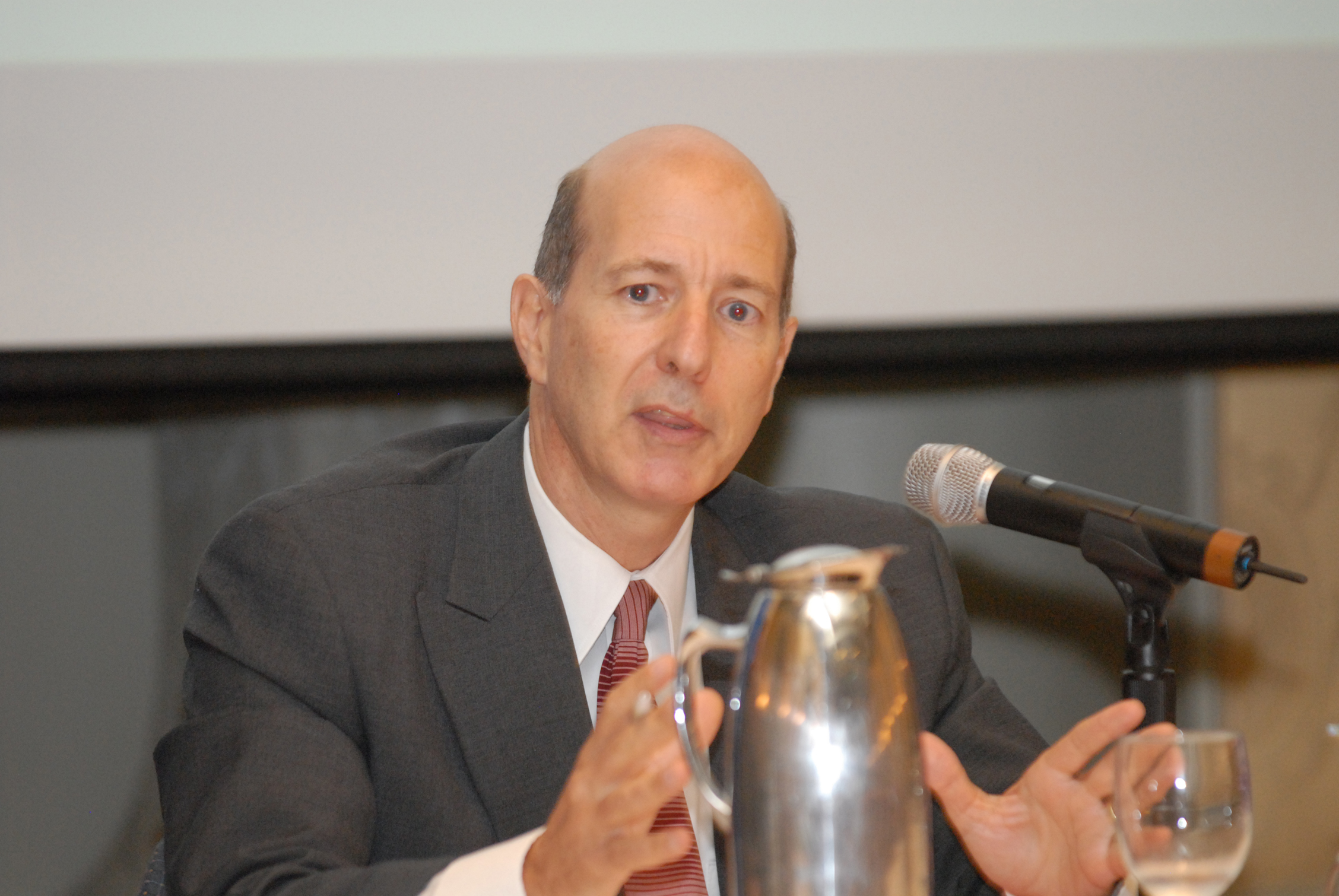
- Born: March 17, 1956 (age 69)

Academic background
- Education: University of Oxford (BA); Yale University (MA, PhD)

Academic work
- Discipline: Macroeconomics
- School or tradition: Post-Keynesian economics
- Website: Information at IDEAS / RePEc

Thomas Palley (born March 17, 1956) is an American economist who was the chief economist for the United States-China Economic and Security Review Commission.

== Career ==
Palley received his Bachelor of Arts degree from Oxford University in 1976. He earned a master's degree in international relations and a PhD in economics from Yale University. Palley founded the Economics for Democratic & Open Societies project. He states its purpose is to "stimulate public discussion about what kinds of economic arrangements and conditions are needed to promote democracy and open society." Palley's previous positions include director of the Open Society Institute’s Globalization Reform Project, and Assistant Director of Public Policy for the AFL-CIO.

His work has covered macroeconomic theory and policy, international finance and trade, economic development, and labor markets where his approach is Post-Keynesian.

== Post-Keynesian work ==
Academically his best known work is the book Post Keynesian Economics: Debt, Distribution, and the Macro Economy. In this book, Palley tries to develop Post-Keynesian macroeconomic models that combine the insights of various 'brands' of post-Keynesian economics including the following: Yale Keynesianism (James Tobin), Cambridge–UK Keynesianism (Nicholas Kaldor), and American Post-Keynesianism (Paul Davidson, Hyman Minsky).

A critique of the book was written by Basil Moore, also a post-Keynesian economist. Moore argues that Palley succeeds in demonstrating the coherence of post-Keynesian macroeconomics. This is done via the concepts of effective demand, price-setting, quantity-taking fix-price supply behavior and the ineffectiveness of nominal wage and price adjustments as a means of remedying aggregate demand deficiencies. But Moore raises the criticism that by using neoclassical tools and methodology Palley has failed to take both time and uncertainty (key post-Keynesian concerns) in a sufficiently serious fashion.

== Selected works ==
- Post Keynesian Economics: Debt, Distribution, and the Macro Economy, Macmillan Press, 1996. Paperback edition, 1996. ISBN 978-0-333-63060-0
- From Financial Crisis to Stagnation: The Destruction of Shared Prosperity and the Role of Economics, Cambridge University Press, 2012, Hardback edition. ISBN 978-1-107-01662-0
