= Athanasios Asimakopulos =

Canadian economist (1930–1990)

- Born: 28 May 1930; Montreal, Quebec, Canada
- Died: May 25, 1990 (aged 59); Montreal, Quebec, Canada

Academic background
- Education: University of Cambridge
- Influences: John Maynard Keynes; Roy Harrod; Joan Robinson; Michał Kalecki

Academic work
- Discipline: Macroeconomics
- School or tradition: Post-Keynesian economics
- Institutions: McGill University

Athanasios "Tom" Asimakopulos (Greek: Αθανάσιος Ασημακόπουλος) (May 28, 1930 – May 25, 1990) was a Canadian economist, who was the "William Dow Professor of Political Economy" in the Department of Economics, McGill University, Montreal, Quebec, Canada. His monograph, Keynes's General Theory and Accumulation, reviews important areas of Keynes's General Theory and the theories of accumulation of two of his followers, Roy Harrod and Joan Robinson.

== Biography ==
Asimakopulos was born in Montreal in 1930. He was educated at McGill University earning a B.A. in 1951 and an M.A. in 1953. In September 1953 Tom went to Cambridge; his research topic was a three-commodity, three-country study in international trade theory entitled Productivity Changes, the Trade Balance and the Terms of Trade. With his classmate Keith Frearson, the Australian economist, Tom went to Joan Robinson's lectures on what would become The Accumulation of Capital – Robinson's magnum opus, which sought to extend Keynes's theory to account for long-run issues of growth and capital accumulation. Initially Asimakopulos was irritated by Robinson's criticisms of the orthodox theories of value and distribution and neoclassical methodology on which he had been brought up. Asimakopulos also went regularly to research students's seminars run by Piero Sraffa, Robin Marris, and Nicholas Kaldor.

Asimakopulos was a Lecturer in Economics and Political Science from 1956 to 1957 at McGill. From 1957 to 1959 he worked as an assistant professor at the Royal Military College. In 1959 he returned to McGill and became an assistant professor, working close to J.C. Weldon. Promoted to the position of associate professor in 1963, he became a full professor in 1966. In 1988 he was appointed "William Dow Professor of Political Economy" on Weldon's vacancy. He served as Chairman of the Department of Economics from 1974 to 1978. Teaching was his top priority; Asimakopulos loved teaching the microeconomics course to the Honours Students at McGill. Even though he had an assistant, Asimakopulos made sure that, from time to time, he gave tutorials himself, on which he would emphasize, ad nauseam the importance of the assumptions of the analysis and its implications on the results of the theoretical model studied. He wrote extensively on the work of such economic theorists as J. M. Keynes, Joan Robinson, and Michał Kalecki. He was active in many professional associations and organizations. He held numerous fellowships and was a Visiting Professor and a Fellow at universities in the United States, England and Australia. From 1976 to 1990 he was a Fellow of the Royal Society of Canada.

Athanasios Asimakopulos died of leukemia in 1990.

== Contributions to economic theory ==
Asimakopulos was a Post Keynesian / "Kaleckian" scholar, who elaborated upon Michał Kalecki's theories. Asimakopulos wrote mainly around and on Keynesian themes and on growth, distribution and technical progress (the latter often with Weldon). Kalecki stress nondeterminants of income distribution, determinants of economic activity, determinants of profits, long-run growth, prospects of economy, or impact of imperfect competition on growth of income has been an important inspiration to Post Keynesian economists, including Asimakopulos.

He viewed himself as a mainstream economist and declined an invitation to be included in the first edition of Philip Arestis and Malcolm Sawyer's A Biographical Dictionary of Dissenting Economists,. He was included in the second edition.

=== Critique of Keynes' Marginal Efficiency of Investment ===
In his General Theory, John Maynard Keynes proposed an investment function of the sort < I = I0 + I(r) > where the relationship between investment and interest rate was of a rather naive form. Firms were presumed to "rank" various investment projects depending on their "internal rate of return" (or "marginal efficiency of investment") and thereafter, faced with a given rate of interest, chose those projects whose internal rate of return exceeded the rate of interest. With an infinite number of projects available, this amounted to arguing that firms would invest until their marginal efficiency of investment was equal to the rate of interest, i.e. < MEI = r >.

Asimakopulos (1971, 1991), Piero Garegnani (1978) and several Post Keynesians offered a critique of Keynes' original formulation. Asimakopulos et al. questioned the possibility of a downward-sloping Marginal Efficiency of Investment (MEI) function in the presence of unemployment.

== Major works published ==
Major works by Athanasios Asimakopulos (partial list):

- Determination of Investment in Keynes's Model, The, 1971, Canadian JE
- Economic Theory, Welfare, and the State: Essays in Honour of John C. Weldon, McGill-Queen's University Press, 1991. ISBN 0-7735-0853-8
- Finance, Saving and Investment, 1986, JPKE
- Introduction to Economic Theory: Microeconomics, An, Oxford University Press, 1978. ISBN 0-19-540281-2
- Investment, Employment, and Income Distribution (Aspects of Political Economy). Westview Pr (Short Disc), 1988. ISBN 0-8133-0789-9
- Kalecki and Keynes on Finance, Investment and Saving, 1983, Cambridge JE
- Kaleckian Theory of Income Distribution, A, 1975, Canadian JE
- Keynes's General Theory and Accumulation (Modern Cambridge Economics Series) (Print on Demand). Cambridge University Press, 2004. ISBN 0-521-36815-4
- Keynes's Theory of Effective Demand Revisited, 1982, Australian EP
- Robinsonian Growth Model in One-Sector Notation, A, 1969, Australian EP
- Signification theorique de la Theorie generale de Keynes, La, 1987, in Boismenu and Dostaler, La Theorie generale et le keynesianisme
- Synoptic View of Some Simple Models of Growth, A, with J.C. Weldon, 1965, Canadian JE and PS
- Theories of Income Distribution, Kluwer Academic Pub, 1988 ISBN 0-89838-232-7

== Bibliography ==
- Arestis, Philip and Sawyer, Malcolm. A Biographical Dictionary of Dissenting Economists. Edward Elgar Publishing, 2000 pp. 7–11 First published 1992 ISBN 1-85898-560-9
- Asimakopulos, Athanasios. Joan Robinson and economic theory. Banca Nazionale Del Lavoro Quarterly, v.151, pp. 381–409, December 1984.
- Asimakopulos, A. Finance, saving and investment in Keynes's economics: a comment. Cambridge Journal of Economics, 1985; 9: 405–407.
- Asimakopulos, A. Richardson on Asimakopulos on finance: a reply. Cambridge Journal of Economics, June 1986; 10: 199–201.
- Asimakopulos, A. Finance, investment and saving: a reply to Terzi. Cambridge Journal of Economics, 1986; 10: 81–82.
- Asimakopulos, Athanasios. Introduction: Kalecki, Keynes and Joan Robinson. In Asimakopulos: Investment, employment and income distribution. Aspects of Political Economy series. Boulder, Colo.: Westview Press; Cambridge: Polity Press in association with Blackwell, 1988, pp. 1–22
- Asimakopulos, Athanasios. Joan Robinson and economic theory. In. Investment, employment and income distribution. Aspects of Political Economy series. Boulder, Colo.: Westview Press; Cambridge: Polity Press in association with Blackwell, 1988, pp. 186–215
- Asimakopulos, Athanasios. Kalecki and Joan Robinson: An 'Outsider's Influence'. Journal of Post Keynesian Economics, v.11, pp. 261–78, Winter 1988–89.
- Asimakopulos, Athanasios. Harrod and Robinson on the equilibrium rate of growth. Banca Nazionale del Lavoro Quarterly Review, n.170, pp. 345–58, September 1989.
- Asimakopulos, Athanasios: Kalecki and Robinson. In: SEBASTIANI, Mario (ed.) Kalecki's relevance today. New York: St. Martin's Press, 1989, pp. 10–24.
- Asimakopulos, Athanasios. Joan Robinson and the Americans. Journal of Post Keynesian Economics, v. 13, n.1, pp. 111–24, Autumn 1990.
- Hein, Eckhard, Ochsen, Carsten. Regimes of Interest Rates, Income Shares, Savings and Investment: A Kaleckian Model and Empirical Estimations for some Advanced OECD Economies Metroeconomica 54 (4), 2003, 404–433.
- Cate, T., Colander, D., and Harcourt, G. Encyclopedia of Keynesian Economics. Cheltemham, UK and Northampton, Mass.: Edward Elgar, 1997.
- Hein, Eckhard. Money, interest and capital accumulationin Karl Marx's economics: a monetary interpretation and some similarities to post-Keynesian approaches. In: The European Journal of the History of Economic Thought, Volume 13, Issue 1 March 2006, pp. 113–140.
- Henwood, Doug. Wall Street: How it Works and for Whom. New York and London: Verso, 1998. First published 1997. Full online edition (382 pages) under Creative Commons Attribution-Non-Commercial-No Derivs License. The author, Doug Henwood, is hereby credited
- Harcourt, G. C. The Structure of Post-Keynesian Economics: The Core Contributions of the Pioneers. Jesus College, Cambridge University Press ISBN 978-0-521-83387-5 ISBN 0521833876
- Kalecki, Michal. Collected Works of Michal Kalecki Vol. I : Capitalism: Business Cycles and Full Employment. Oxford University Press. ISBN 0-19-828667-8
- Kalecki, Michal. Collected Works of Michal Kalecki Vol. III: Socialism, – Functioning and Long-Run Planning. Edited by Jerzy Osiatynski. Oxford at the Clarendon Press. Oxford, 1992
- Kalecki, Michal. Collected Works of Michal Kalecki Vol. V : Developing Economies. Editor: Osiatynski, Jerzy. Translator: Kisiel, Chester A. Oxford at the Clarendon Press. Oxford, 1993. ISBN 0-19-828667-8
- Kalecki, Michal. Collected Works of Michal Kalecki Volume VI. Oxford University Press. ISBN 0-19-828668-6
- Kalecki, Michal. Collected Works of Michal Kalecki. Volume VII: Studies in Applied Economics, 1940–1967; Miscellanea. Oxford at the Clarendon Press. Oxford, 1997. ISBN 0-19-828989-8
- Kalecki, Michal. Theory of Economic Dynamics: An Essay on Cyclical and Long-Run Changes in Capitalist Economy. New York, NY: Augustus M. Kelley, Publishers, 1969.
- Kalecki, Michal. The Last Phase in the Transformation of Capitalism. New York. 1972. Introduction by George R. Feiwel. Reprint. ISBN 0-85345-211-3
- Kalecki, Michal. Studies in the theory of business cycles, 1933–1939. Translated by Ada Kalecka. Oxford: Basil Blackwell/ Warszawa: Polish Scientific Publishers, 1966. First Edition in English (1st Polish ed., 1962).
- Kalecki, Michal, Zofia Dobrska, Ignacy Sachs & Jerzy Tepicht. Essays on Planning and Economic Development. Center of Research on Underdeveloped Economies Research Papers. Vol.1; Warsaw 1963.
- Kalecki, Michal. Selected Essays on the Dynamics of the Capitalist Economy 1933–1970. Cambridge University Press, 1971.
- Kalecki, Michal. Introduction to the Theory of Growth in a Socialist Economy. Blackwell Publishers; 1970. ISBN 0-631-12310-5.
- Kalecki, Michal. Essays in the Theory of Economic Fluctuations. New York: Farrar & Rinehart, Inc., 1939. ISBN 0-415-31372-4
- Kalecki, Michal. Selected Essays on the Economic Growth of the Socialist and the Mixed Economy. Cambridge: University Press, 1972. ISBN 0-521-08447-4
- Kalecki, Michal. Essays on Developing Economics. Humanities/Harvester Press, Atlantic Highlands, New Jersey/Hassocks, Sussex, 1979. ISBN 0855271345
- O'Hara, Phillip Anthony. The Revival of Political Economy and its Main Protagonists: 1960s to the Present. History of Economics Review pp. 140–151.
- Rowley, J. C. R. Athanasios Asimakopulos, 1930–1990, Canadian Journal of Economics, Vol. 24 (1991), 234–5.
- Rowley, J. C. R. Athanasios Asimakopulos, 1930–1990, Proceedings of the Royal Society of Canada, Vol. 4 (1994), 7–10.
