= Gallegati =

Gallegati is an Italian surname. Notable people with the surname include:

- Ercole Gallegati (1911–1990), Italian wrestler
- Mauro Gallegati (born 1958), Italian economist
