= Horizontalism =

Horizontalism is an approach to money creation theory pioneered by Basil Moore which states that private bank reserves are not managed by central banks. Instead reserves will be provided on demand at the bank rate set by the central bank. This inverts the mainstream textbook money multiplier relationship between deposits and loans since loans are said to cause deposits which in turn cause reserves.

Horizontalism influenced monetary circuit theorists to develop the endogenous money approach that was already nascent within post-Keynesian academic thought. It states that an increasing demand for loans by bank customers leads to banks making more loans and creating more deposits, without regard to the size of the bank's available reserves. Thus credit money created by private banks can be seen to be leveraging of those reserves without the guidance of a particular leverage ratio, i.e. horizontal leveraging.
