= Palley =

Palley is a surname. Notable people with the surname include:

- Ahrn Palley (1914–1993), Rhodesian politician
- Claire Palley (born 1931), South African academic and lawyer
- Reese Palley (1922–2015), entrepreneur, gallerist, and sailor
- Thomas Palley (born 1956), American economist
