= Lars Pålsson Syll =

Swedish economist (born 1957)

Lars Jörgen Pålsson Syll
- Born: November 5, 1957 (age 68)

Academic background
- Influences: John Maynard Keynes; John Kenneth Galbraith; Hyman Minsky; Amartya Sen

Academic work
- Discipline: Economics; History of economic thought
- School or tradition: Post-Keynesian economics Critical Realism

Lars Jörgen Pålsson Syll (born November 5, 1957) is a Swedish economist who is a professor of Social Studies and associate professor of Economic History at Malmö University College. Pålsson Syll has been a prominent contributor to the economic debate in Sweden over the 2008 financial crisis.

== Biography ==
Lars Jörgen Pålsson Syll (born in 1957) received a PhD in economic history in 1991 and a PhD in economics in 1997, both at Lund University. In 1995 he was appointed associate professor in economic history at Malmö University College. In 2004 he was appointed a professor of social studies at Malmö University College. He researches and teaches the history of economic theory and methodology. Other research areas include theories of distributive justice and critical realist social science. He also studied under Hyman Minsky as a young research stipendiate in the U.S. at the beginning of the 1980s. Lars Pålsson Syll has written several books and many articles in scientific journals.

== Views ==
=== General ===
Pålsson Syll believes in a Post-Keynesian and institutional approach to the study of the economy. This theory, notably advanced by Douglass North and Robert Fogel, emphasizes the importance of efficient institutions in achieving economic growth. He has described both Joseph Schumpeter and John Kenneth Galbraith as "quasi-institutionalists", in the meaning they were "heterodox-economists", influenced by other schools of thought. He is a critical realist and an outspoken opponent of all kinds of social constructivism and postmodern relativism. He has been strongly influenced by John Maynard Keynes. In 2011 he was a strong supporter of Paul Romer to be awarded the Nobel prize for economics for his work on how people really behave in the market.

Pålsson Syll is a critic of neoliberalism and market fundamentalism, which he attacked in his 2001 book "The dismal science: economics and the neoliberalism crisis". He traces today's problems to the mid-1970s, when, according to Syll, economists began to dominate the public welfare discourse, using neo-classical microeconomic arguments that the public sector should be run in the same way as the private sector. Syll claims that these economists denied that there was any real difference between manufacturing and social services, and felt the recipients of these services should be treated as informed customers. They felt that tax-funded welfare institutions were disincentives to the entrepreneurship that promoted growth. However, Pålsson Syll has argued that greater income equality may in fact foster growth, since a stronger safety net allows individuals to take greater risks. He also thinks that excessive wealth of a few individuals can cause a strain on democracy.

Pålsson Syll's theories have been criticized by right-wing economists such as Henrik Jordahl, Andreas Bergh and author Johan Norberg.

=== 2008 financial crisis ===
Regarding the 2008 financial crisis, Pålsson Syll said capitalism has an inherent tendency to periodically create speculative bubbles in different asset markets. He blames the massive deregulation of the financial markets in the 1980s for both the 1990s crisis and the more recent crisis that began in 2008, and has called for a return to tighter regulation and greater transparency. He sees low interest rates as a risk to the economy. They hurt those dependent on investment income. More important, the central bank loses their main economic stimulation tool. And there is a risk of deflation, which can cause long-term economic contraction. In 2009 he proposed the radical solution of a lottery each year through which the central bank would take back all bank notes with a given final digit in their serial number. This would in effect be a negative interest rate of 10%, reducing the value of money and encouraging consumption, which would kick-start the economy. Although not in favor of protectionism, he has said that if the United States and other European Union countries begin introducing protectionist measures Sweden may be forced to do so too, in a variant of the prisoner's dilemma.

== Bibliography ==
- Lars Pålsson Syll (1991). Samhälleliga val, värde och exploatering: en ekonomisk-filosofisk kritik (Social Choice, Value and Exploitation: an Economic-Philosophical Critique) (in Swedish). Economisk-historiska föreningen. p. 181.
- Lars Pålsson Syll (1997). Den Strukturanalytiska Traditionen: En Studie I Ekonomisk Teori – Och Metodutveckling I Sverige (The Structure Analytic Tradition: A Study in Economic Theory and Method Development In Sweden) (in Swedish). Studentlitteratur. p. 112. ISBN 9789144003597.
- Lars Pålsson Syll (1998). De ekonomiska teoriernas historia. Studentlitteratur. p. 483. ISBN 91-44-04108-X.
- Lars Pålsson Syll (2001). Ekonomisk teori och metod : ett kritisk-realistiskt perspektiv (Economic Theory and Method: A Critical Realist Perspective) (in Swedish). Studentlitteratur. p. 202. ISBN 9789144014340.
- Lars Pålsson Syll (2001). Den dystra vetenskapen: om nationalekonomins och nyliberalismens kris (The dismal science: economics and the neoliberalism crisis). Atlas Akademi. p. 178. ISBN 9789189044623.
- Lars Pålsson Syll; Joakim Appelquist; Kristian Nyberg (2002). Vad bör kommunerna göra?: ekonomi och marknadsreformer inom den kommunala sektorn (What should municipalities do?: Economy and market reform in the municipal sector) (in Swedish). Jönköping Univ. Press. p. 122. ISBN 9789197312059.
- Amartya Sen on Neo-Liberalism (2004), The History of Economic Theories (in Swedish, fourth ed 2007),
- Lars Pålsson Syll (2007). John Maynard Keynes. SNS Förlag. p. 95. ISBN 9789185695270.
- Lars Pålsson Syll (1995). Den strukturanalytiska skolan i Lund: en essä om Johan Åkerman, Erik Dahmén, Ingvar Svennilson och ekonomisk teori- och metodutveckling (The structure of the analytic school in Lund: an essay on Johan Akerman, Erik Dahmén, Ingvar Svennilson and economic theory and methodology) (in Swedish). Ekonomisk-historiska fören. p. 109. ISBN 9789185611386.
- Lars Pålsson Syll (2011). Ekonomisk doktrinhistoria (History of economic theories) (in Swedish). Studentlitteratur. p. 198. ISBN 9789144068343.
