= Monetary circuit theory =

Holds that money is created endogenously by the banking sector

Monetary circuit theory is a heterodox theory of monetary economics, particularly money creation, often associated with the post-Keynesian school. It holds that money is created endogenously by the banking sector, rather than exogenously by central bank lending; it is a theory of endogenous money. It is also called circuitism and the circulation approach.

== Contrast with mainstream theory ==
The key distinction from mainstream economic theories of money creation is that circuitism holds that money is created endogenously by the banking sector, rather than exogenously by the government through central bank lending: that is, the economy creates money itself (endogenously), rather than money being provided by some outside agent (exogenously).

These theoretical differences lead to a number of different consequences and policy prescriptions; circuitism rejects, among other things, the money multiplier based on reserve requirements, arguing that money is created by banks lending, which only then pulls in reserves from the central bank, rather than by re-lending money pushed in by the central bank. The money multiplier arises instead from capital adequacy ratios, i.e. the ratio of its capital to its risk-weighted assets.

== Circuitist model ==
Circuitism is easily understood in terms of familiar bank accounts and debit card or credit card transactions: bank deposits are just an entry in a bank account book (not specie – bills and coins), and a purchase subtracts money from the buyer's account with the bank, and adds it to the seller's account with the bank.

=== Transactions ===
As with other monetary theories, circuitism distinguishes between hard money – money that is exchangeable at a given rate for some commodity, such as gold – and credit money. The theory considers credit money created by commercial banks as primary (at least in modern economies), rather than derived from central bank money – credit money drives the monetary system. While it does not claim that all money is credit money – historically money has often been a commodity, or exchangeable for such – basic models begin by only considering credit money, adding other types of money later.

In circuitism, a monetary transaction – buying a loaf of bread, in exchange for dollars, for instance – is not a bilateral transaction (between buyer and seller) as in a barter economy, but is rather a tripartite transaction between buyer, seller, and bank. Rather than a buyer handing over a physical good in exchange for their purchase, instead there is a debit to their account at a bank, and a corresponding credit to the seller's account. This is precisely what happens in credit card or debit card transactions, and in the circuitist account, this is how all credit money transactions occur.

For example, if one purchases a loaf of bread with fiat money bills, it may appear that one is purchasing the bread in exchange for the commodity of "dollar bills", but circuitism argues that one is instead simply transferring a credit, here with the issuing central bank: as the bills are not backed by anything, they are ultimately just a physical record of a credit with the central bank, not a commodity.

=== Monetary creation ===
In circuitism, as in other theories of credit money, credit money is created by a loan being extended. Crucially, this loan need not (in principle) be backed by any central bank money: the money is created from the promise (credit) embodied in the loan, not from the lending or relending of central bank money: credit is prior to reserves.

When the loan is repaid, with interest, the credit money of the loan is destroyed, but reserves (equal to the interest) are created – the profit from the loan.

The failure of monetary policy during depressions – central banks give money to commercial banks, but the commercial banks do not lend it out – is referred to as "pushing on a string", and is cited by circuitists in favor of their model: credit money is pulled out by loans being made, not pushed out by central banks printing money and giving it to commercial banks to lend.

In 2014, economist Richard Werner conducted an empirical study to determine if, in the process of issuing a loan, banks create new money or transfer money from another account. The study involved taking out a loan with a cooperating bank and monitoring their internal records to determine if the bank transfers the funds from other accounts within or outside the bank, or whether they are newly created. The study determined that the bank did not transfer funds between any accounts when the loan was issued.

== History ==
Circuitism was developed by French and Italian economists after World War II; it was officially presented by Augusto Graziani in (Graziani 1989), following an earlier outline in (Graziani 1984).

The notion and terminology of a money circuit dates at least to 1903, when amateur economist Nicholas Johannsen wrote Der Kreislauf des Geldes und Mechanismus des Sozial-Lebens (The Circuit Theory of Money), under the pseudonym J.J.O. Lahn (Graziani 2003). In the interwar period, German and Austrian economists studied monetary circuits, under the term Kreislauf, with the term "circuit" being introduced by French economists following this usage. The main protagonists of the French approach to the monetary circuit is Alain Parguez. Today, the main defenders of the theory of the monetary circuit can be found in the work of Riccardo Realfonzo, Giuseppe Fontana and Riccardo Bellofiore in Italy; and in Canada, in the work of Marc Lavoie, Louis-Philippe Rochon and Mario Seccareccia.

== Modeling difficulties ==
While the verbal description of circuitism has attracted interest, it has proven difficult to model mathematically. Initial efforts to model the monetary circuit proved problematic, with models exhibiting a number of unexpected and undesired properties – money disappearing immediately, for instance. These problem go by such names as:

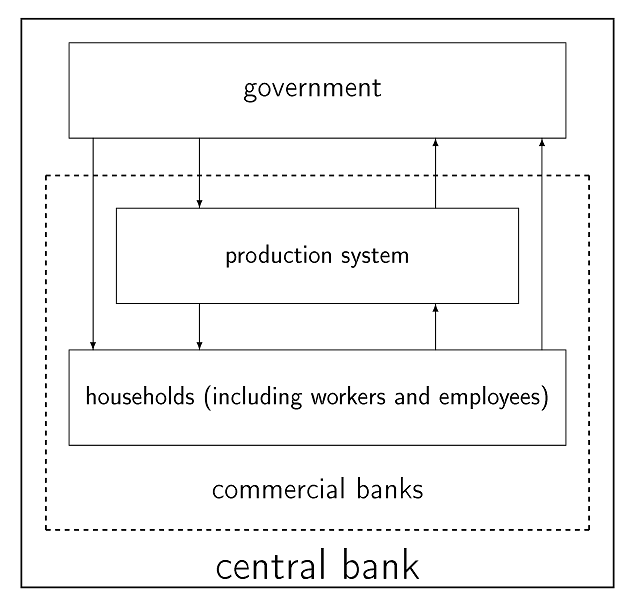
The streams of money in the national economy

- Losses in Circuit
- Destruction of Money
- Dilemma of profit

A comprehensive model of the total monetary circuit, which is free from the above difficulties, was presented recently by Pokrovskii et al. The figure shows the money flows between the main economic agents. These agents can be imagined as immersed in the monetary environment created by the government, central bank, and many commercial banks. The production system creates all products and generates cash flows between production units as well as from production units to other economic entities. The government, as a central economic entity, represents the common interests of all members of society. It receives its share of the value produced in the form of taxes that are returned to other economic entities in various amounts.

The central bank and commercial banks inject an indefinite amount of money in coins, banknotes, and deposits into the system made up of the government and many commercial bank customers. Money circulates in the economy, providing the exchange of products. The direction of money flow is opposite to the direction of product flow; two flows (product flow and money flow) move along the same contour towards each other, but are relatively independent. Product flow is determined by specific technological conditions; the origin of flows lies in the natural environment, and flows end with the final consumption of goods.

The described scheme allows us to formulate an evolutionary system of money circulation equations (Pokrovskii and Schinkus, 2016; Schinckus et al., 2018). Two variables are assigned to each economic agent: the volume of deposits and loans issued by the bank. When some assumptions and simplifications are introduced, the evolutionary system is written as a closed system of seven equations. The system determines trajectory of evolution at given production program, government budget and external money flows. A special feature of the approach in the work (Pokrovsky and Schinkus, 2016) is the introduction and use of global characteristics of the system, including the cost of producing and maintaining circulation of one monetary unit per unit of time (κ), the ratio of income of the banking system to social public output with the exception of bank income, that is, the efficiency coefficient of the system (R), and a measure of distribution of credit money (ξ*). These quantities should be set. The ratio κ/R is the velocity of money in the well-known quantitative theory of money.

== See also ==
- Modern Monetary Theory, another theory of endogenous money
- Post-Keynesian economics

== Sources ==
- Graziani, Augusto (1984), "The debate on Keynes's finance motive", Monte dei Paschi di Siena Economic Notes: 5–33
- Graziani, Augusto (1989), Theory of the Monetary Circuit, Thames Polytechnic, ISBN 978-0-902169-39-5
- Graziani, Augusto (2003), The Monetary Theory of Production, Cambridge University Press, ISBN 978-0-521-10417-3
