= Tracy Mott =

American economist (1946–2021)

Tracy L. Mott
- Born: 4 November 1946; Memphis,TN, US
- Died: 4 November 2021 (aged 75); Denver, CO

Academic background
- Education: Stanford University (Ph.D., Economics, 1982); Union Theological Seminary (M.Div., 1974); Princeton University (A.B., 1968)
- Doctoral advisor: Donald J. Harris
- Influences: Keynes, Kalecki, Steindl, Wicksell

Academic work
- Discipline: Economics
- School or tradition: post-Keynesian economics
- Institutions: University of Denver

Tracy Land Mott (November 4, 1946 — November 4, 2021) was an American economist in the field of post-Keynesian economics and a scholar of the ideas of John Maynard Keynes, Michael Kalecki, and Josef Steindl. He was particularly interested in the determinants of investment (macroeconomics).

Mott studied at Princeton University and then attended Union Theological Seminary to earn his Master’s Degree in Divinity. He earned his PhD in Economics from Stanford University where he studied with Duncan Foley, among others, and wrote his dissertation under the supervision of Don Harris. His first academic appointment was at the University of Colorado Boulder, but Mott spent the majority of his career at the University of Denver.

Early articles by Mott include "Towards a Post-Keynesian Formulation of Liquidity Preference" and "The Investment Theories of Kalecki and Keynes" (his most cited work co-authored with Steven Fazzari). Both were published in the Journal of Post-Keynesian Economics (JPKE). He also co-authored "A Cointegration Analysis of the US Money Supply Process" with Hamid Baghestani in the Journal of Macroeconomics.

He published his first book in 2004, which is an edited volume on the contributions of Josef Steindl co-authored with Nina Shapiro. His second book was published in 2009 and summarized much of his thinking about Kalecki and investment. His last publications were chapters in edited volumes with a former student from his CU Boulder days and with a long-time colleague at the University of Denver.

Mott died on his 75th birthday in Denver, CO.

== Life and education ==
Tracy Land Mott was born on November 4, 1946 in Memphis, Tennessee to Albert and Sara Louise Mott. He graduated from Princeton University in 1968 and lived in New York City, working for different community agencies.

Mott earned his Master's in Divinity in 1974 and his PhD in Economics in 1982 from Stanford University. He was very interested in the ideas of John Maynard Keynes and Michael Kalecki especially regarding investment.

After graduating, Mott moved to Colorado to join the faculty at the University of Colorado in Boulder as an assistant professor. In 1991, he joined the University of Denver (DU) as an associate professor and he stayed there until his retirement in 2018. During his time at DU, he served as department chair multiple times and became professor of economics. He was recognized as professor emeritus prior to his passing.

== Selected publications ==
=== Journal articles ===
- Mott, Tracy. "Towards a post-Keynesian formulation of liquidity preference." Journal of Post Keynesian Economics 8, no. 2 (1985): 222-232.
- Fazzari, Steven M., and Tracy L. Mott. "The investment theories of Kalecki and Keynes: an empirical study of firm data, 1970–1982." Journal of Post Keynesian Economics 9, no. 2 (1986): 171-187.
- Mott, Tracy. "A Post Keynesian perspective on a “cashless competitive payments system”." Journal of Post Keynesian Economics 11, no. 3 (1989): 360-369.
- Mott, Tracy, and Edward Slattery. "Tax incidence and macroeconomic effects in a Kaleckian model when profits finance affects investment and prices may respond to taxes." Journal of Post Keynesian Economics 16, no. 3 (1994): 391-410.
- Baghestani, Hamid, and Tracy Mott. "A cointegration analysis of the US money supply process." Journal of Macroeconomics 19, no. 2 (1997): 269-283.
- Lopez, Julio, and Tracy Mott. "Kalecki versus Keynes on the determinants of investment." Review of Political Economy 11, no. 3 (1999): 291-301.
- Mott, Tracy. "Kenneth Boulding, 1910‐1993." The Economic Journal 110, no. 464 (2000): F430-F444.
- Baghestani, Hamid, and Tracy Mott. "On the behaviour of UK money, velocity, prices, and output in the gold standard period: 1871–1913." Applied Economics 41, no. 10 (2009): 1241-1249.
- Baghestani, Hamid, and Tracy Mott. "Asymmetries in the relation between investment and output." Journal of Post Keynesian Economics 37, no. 2 (2014): 357-365.
- Mott, Tracy. "Jan Toporowski. Michal Kalecki: an Intellectual Biography." History of Economics Review 61 (2015): 105-108.

=== Books ===
- Mott, Tracy, and Nina Shapiro. Rethinking capitalist development: essays on the economics of Josef Steindl. Routledge, 2004.
- Mott, Tracy. Kalecki's principle of increasing risk and Keynesian economics. Routledge, 2009.

=== Book chapters and other contributions ===
- Mott, Tracy, and Edward Slattery. "The influence of changes in income distribution on aggregate demand in a Kaleckian model: stagnation vs. exhilaration reconsidered." In Employment, growth and finance, pp. 69–82. Edward Elgar Publishing, 1994.
- Mott, Tracy. "A Kaleckian view of New Keynesian Macroeconomics." In New Keynesian Economics / Post Keynesian Alternatives, pp. 262–273. Routledge, 1998.
- Mott, Tracy. "Longer-run aspects of Kaleckian macroeconomics." In The Economics of Demand-led Growth: Challenging the Supply-side Vision of the Long Run. Cheltenham, UK (2002): 153-171.
- Mott, Tracy. "Investment." In The Elgar Companion on Post-Keynesian Economics. London: Edward Elgar (2003).
- Mott, Tracy, and Mark Evers. "A Kaleckian Perspective on Changes in the Aggregate Income Distribution in the US." In Michał Kalecki in the 21st Century, pp. 182–197. London: Palgrave Macmillan UK, 2015.
- Mott, Tracy, and P. Sai-wing Ho. "Rosa Luxemburg, Mikhail Tugan-Baranovsky and the current state of economic crisis." In Conflict, Demand and Economic Development, pp. 191–201. Routledge India, 2020.
- Mott, Tracy. "Modigliani–Miller theorem." In Elgar Encyclopedia of Central Banking, pp. 325–326. Edward Elgar Publishing Limited, 2025.

== Annual Tracy Mott Economic Theory and Policy Workshops ==
The Department of Economics at the University of Denver launched an annual workshop in Tracy Mott's name and memory in 2022. The themes of the workshop go beyond Tracy's academic work, but true to his example focus on both theory and policy as well as scholarly work by faculty and contributions from students. The workshop is supported by an endowed fund in Tracy Mott's name.

- 2022 (September 23–24): Inaugural Tracy Mott Economic Theory and Policy Workshop featuring L. Randall Wray (Bard College), Malcolm Sawyer (University of Leeds), Jan Toporowski (King's College London), and Korkut Ertürk (University of Utah).
  - Other participants: Nina Eichacker (The University of Rhode Island), Joseph Chul-kyoo Jung (Mount Royal University), Yeo Hyub Yoon (University of Denver), Tanweer Akram (Bermuda Monetary Authority).
- 2023 (September 30): "A Pluralist Exploration of Social Reproduction and Caring" featuring Nancy Folbre (Umass-Amherst) and Elissa Braunstein (Colorado State University).
  - Other participants: Tanima Ahmed (World Bank), Catherine Ruetschlin, Yazgi Genç (University of Utah), Daniel Grabner & Linda S. Li (Vienna University of Economics and Business), Madison Beckner (University of Denver), Samantha Sterba & Nathaniel Cline (University of Redlands), and Sonia Hoque (University College London).
- 2024: "Urban Ecosystems, Land Use, and Housing" featuring John Carruthers (Cornell University) and Panagiotis (Peter) Tsigaris (Thompson River University).
  - Other participants: Ellie Lochhead (New York University), Paula Cole, Daniel S. Brrison, Paul Sutton and Dean Saitta (University of Denver), Luke Maddock (Colorado State University).
- 2025: "Teaching Economics from Interdisciplinary Perspectives: Addressing Crises in Polarized Societies" featuring faculty and students from the University of Denver: Tamara Trafton, Paula Cole, Ephi Woku, Daniel Ossa, Benjamin Lindley, Benjamin Merson, Madigan St. George, Barbekka Hurtt, Kaitlyn Sims, and Daniel Melleno.

== See also ==
- List of Post-Keynesian economists
- Heterodox economics
