= Jan Kregel =

American economist (born 1944)

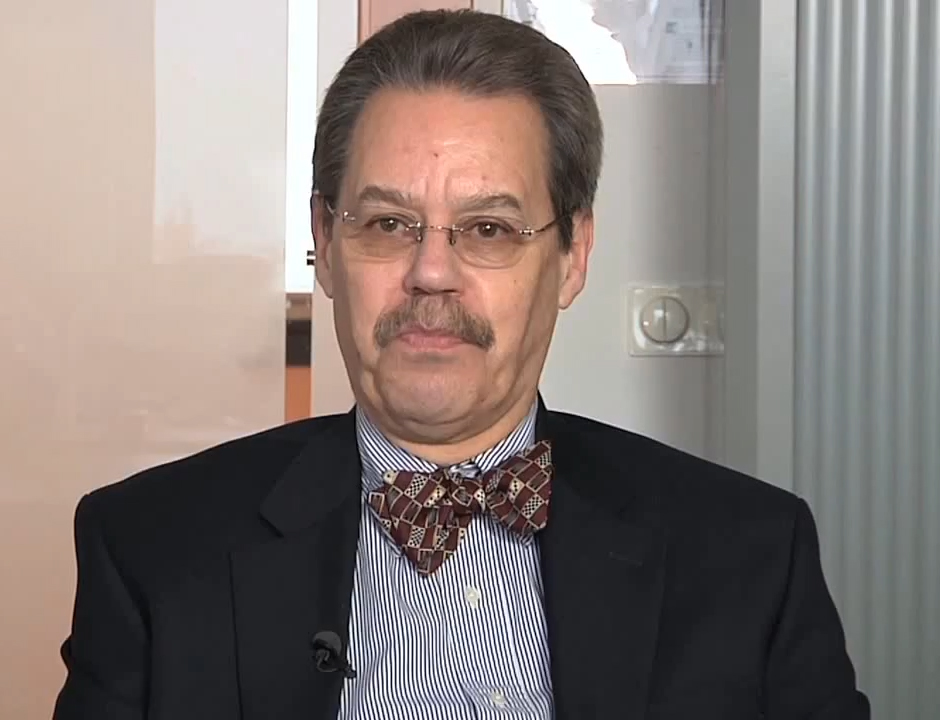
- Born: 19 April 1944 (age 81); Dallas, Texas

Academic work
- School or tradition: Post-Keynesian economics
- Website: Information at IDEAS / RePEc

Jan A. Kregel (born 19 April 1944) is an American post-Keynesian economist.

Kregel has served since 2006 as Professor of Finance and Development at Tallinn University of Technology, Tallinn, Estonia. He is an adjunct professor at Johns Hopkins SAIS (SAIS), whose Bologna Center he co-directed in the late 1980s, and a visiting professor at the University of Missouri–Kansas City. He is also one of the Senior Scholars at the Levy Economics Institute of Bard College. Until 2007, he was Chief of the Policy Analysis and Development Branch of the Financing for Development Office of United Nations Department of Economic and Social Affairs. Until 2004, he was High Level Expert in International Finance and Macroeconomics in the New York Liaison Office of UNCTAD, being in essence its chief economist. For many years, he held the Chair for Political Economy at the University of Bologna.

Kregel studied mainly at the University of Cambridge (with Joan Robinson and Nicholas Kaldor) and Rutgers University (Ph.D. 1970 under supervision of Paul Davidson). He is a Life Fellow of the Royal Economic Society in London and in 2000 he co-founded The Other Canon, a center and network for heterodox economics research, with main founder and executive chairman Erik Reinert.

Kregel is the program director for the Master of Science in Economic Theory and Policy of the Levy Economics Institute of Bard College. The Program was started in 2014.

== Publications ==
- Rate of Profit, Distribution and Growth: Two Views. London: Macmillan; Chicago: Aldine, 1971
- The Theory of Economic Growth. London: Macmillan, 1972
- The Reconstruction of Political Economy. London: Macmillan, 1973
- The Theory of Capital. London: Macmillan, 1976
- Market Shock: An Agenda for Economic and Social Reconstruction of Central and Eastern Europe. Ann Arbor: University of Michigan Press, 1992 (with others)
- Economic Development and Financial Instability: Selected Essays. London: Anthem, 2014
