= The Keynes Solution =

2009 book by Paul Davidson

The Keynes Solution: The Path to Global Economic Prosperity
- Author: Paul Davidson
- Language: English
- Subject: Economics
- Publisher: Palgrave Macmillan
- Publication date: 2009
- Media type: Hardcover
- Pages: 208
- ISBN: 978-0-230-61920-3

The Keynes Solution: The Path to Global Economic Prosperity is a nonfiction work by Paul Davidson about The General Theory of Employment, Interest and Money by John Maynard Keynes.

== Synopsis ==
Davidson sought to explain how Keynesian economics can lead the way out of the 2008 financial crisis. Davidson explained how the crisis was created, gave an explanation of Keynesian policies, and then offered advice on how to reform the current international trade and monetary systems to conform to Keynes’s ideas. In his appendix, he offered his view that “true” Keynesian theory was never taught in American universities and therefore had not been applied to the economy of the United States.

== See also ==
- 2008–2009 Keynesian resurgence

== Notes and references ==
James Pressley (February 16, 2010). "Keynes Has Answer to China's $2.4 Trillion Problem: Book Review". Bloomberg News.
