= Riccardo Realfonzo =

Italian economist (born 1964)

Riccardo Realfonzo (born 29 July 1964) is a well-known post-Keynesian economist.

He is full professor at the University of Sannio (Italy) where in the late 2000s directed the economic department. Realfonzo was a member of the scientific committee of "Industria 2015" (2006–2007). After that he was two times the councilman for economic affairs of the city of Naples.

Realfonzo studied mainly at the University of Naples (with Augusto Graziani), at the University of Florence and at the University of Cambridge.

Among his publications are Money and Banking (Elgar 1998) and several papers in international journals and books; among other things he edited, with G. Fontana, The Monetary Theory of Production. Tradition and Perspectives (Macmillan, 2005). He is the editor of the magazine on line “Economia e Politica”.

In 2010 he was the promoter of the “Letter from the economists” against the austerity in Europe, a manifesto signed by more than 300 scholars. He is an editorialist of the main Italian economic newspaper Il Sole 24 Ore.

Realfonzo is particularly known for his contributions to the theory of monetary circuit, the post-Keynesian approach to the theory of money and income distribution particularly developed in Italy, France, Canada and USA.

== Publications ==
- Realfonzo, Riccardo; Realfonzo, Riccardo (1998). Money and banking: theory and debate (1900 - 1940). Cheltenham: Edward Elgar. ISBN 978-1-85898-765-1.
- Fontana, Giuseppe; Realfonzo, Riccardo, eds. (2005). The monetary theory of production: tradition and perspectives. Basingstoke, Hampshire; New York: Palgrave Macmillan. ISBN 978-1-4039-3259-4. OCLC 56111694.
- Realfonzo, Riccardo; Vita, Carmen, eds. (2006). Sviluppo dualistico e mezzogiorni d'Europa: verso nuove interpretazioni dei divari regionali in Europa e in Italia. Economia Sez. 5. Milano: F. Angeli. ISBN 978-88-464-8194-8.
- Realfonzo, Riccardo, ed. (2008). Qualità del lavoro e politiche per il Mezzogiorno: verso una nuova legislazione del lavoro in Campania. Economia Ricerche. Milano: F. Angeli. ISBN 978-88-568-0331-0.
- Leon, Paolo; Realfonzo, Riccardo, eds. (2008). L'economia della precarietà. La nuova talpa. Roma: Manifestolibri. ISBN 978-88-7285-553-9.
- Realfonzo, Riccardo (1996). Moneta e banca: la teoria e il dibattito 1900-1940. Pubblicazioni del Centro interdepartimentale per gli studi aziendali, economici e sociali dell'Università di Salerno sede di Benvento. Napoli: Ed. scientifiche italiane. ISBN 978-88-8114-272-9.
