= Mauro Gallegati =

Italian economist (born 1958)

Mauro Gallegati (born 8 March 1958) is an Italian New-Keynesian economist, scholar of agent-based economics, and professor at Marche Polytechnic University in Ancona, Italy.

== Biography ==
After having earned his PhD in economics in 1989 at Marche Polytechnic University with a thesis on financial fragility under the supervision of Hyman Minsky, Gallegati has held visiting positions, both as a scholar and as a professor at Washington University in St. Louis, University of Cambridge, Stanford University, Massachusetts Institute of Technology, Columbia University, Santa Fe Institute, Brookings Institution, University of Technology Sydney, Kyoto University, and ETH Zurich.

He currently teaches advanced macroeconomics at Marche Polytechnic University, in the Faculty of Economics, with Giorgio Fuà. He has been the president of the ESHIA Society (economic science with heterogeneous interacting agents).

His research activity is mainly focused on complexity economics. Within this field of research, he has published scientific works with Bruce Greenwald, Joseph Stiglitz, and Domenico Delli Gatti.

With Joseph Stiglitz, Gallegati has developed a theory of asymmetric information with heterogeneous agents and its applications.

Gallegati is a member of the Institute for New Economic Thinking.

== Books ==
- Mauro Gallegati, Vie di fuga, Editore Ogni Uomo è Tutti Gli Uomini, 2013. ISBN 8896691729
- Mauro Gallegati, Oltre la siepe, Chiarelettere, 2014. ISBN 8861905560

== Bibliography ==
- Interview of Mauro Gallegati and Laura Gardini (Harrisonburg, Virginia, 18 May 2008), in: John Barkley Rosser, Richard P. F. Holt, David C. Colander (a cura +di), European Economics at a Crossroads, Edward Elgar Publishing, 2010 ISBN 978-1-84844-581-9 (pp. 94–105)
- Mauro Gallegati, on Institute for New Economic Thinking
- Mauro Gallegati, on Università Politecnica delle Marche
- Roberto Bagnoli, Il prof che spiega l'economia secondo Grillo, Corriere della sera, 13 February 2013
