= Augusto Graziani =

Italian economist

- Born: 4 May 1933; Naples
- Died: 5 January 2014 (aged 80)

Academic work
- Discipline: Monetary economics
- School or tradition: Post-Keynesian economics
- Notable ideas: Monetary circuit theory

Augusto Graziani (4 May 1933 – 5 January 2014) was an Italian economist, Professor in Political Economy at University la Sapienza, most known for his contribution to monetary economics in founding monetary circuit theory.

== Biography ==
He graduated in economics and commerce from the "Federico II" University of Naples under Giuseppe Di Nardi, subsequently continuing his studies first at the London School of Economics with Lionel Robbins and then at Harvard University in Massachusetts, USA, where he met Wassily Leontief and Paul Rosenstein-Rodan.

In 1962, he became a professor of political economy at the University of Catania. In 1965, he was a professor of economic policy at the University of Naples. Since 1989, he has been a full professor of political economy at the Faculty of Economics and Commerce at "La Sapienza" University of Rome. He collaborated with Manlio Rossi-Doria at the Specialization Centre of Portici, and with Francesco Compagna on "Nord e Sud".

During the 11th legislature, he was proclaimed Senator of the Republic in the group of the Democratic Party of the Left, succeeding Gerardo Chiaromonte, who died in 1993.

== See also ==
- Endogenous money
