= James Crotty (economist) =

American economist (1940–2023)

James R. Crotty
- Born: December 26, 1940; Bronx, New York, US
- Died: January 9, 2023 (aged 82)

Academic background
- Education: Carnegie Mellon University
- Influences: Karl Marx; John Maynard Keynes

Academic work
- Discipline: heterodox economics, macroeconomics
- School or tradition: Post-Keynesian economics, Marxian economics
- Institutions: UMass Amherst

James R. Crotty (December 26, 1940 – January 9, 2023) was an American post-Keynesian macroeconomist whose research in theory and policy attempts to integrate the complementary analytical strengths of the Marxian and Keynesian traditions. He has made contributions to the social structure of accumulation (SSA) theory; the implications of radical uncertainty for macro theory and theories of financial markets.

== Education ==
Crotty got a degree from Fordham University in 1961 and masters from Carnegie-Mellon University in 1963. Crotty received his Ph.D. from Carnegie Mellon University in 1973.

== Career ==
Crotty was an Economist and Operations Research Analyst at Mellon National Bank and Trust Company from 1963 to 1966. He was an assistant professor at the State University of New York at Buffalo from 1966 to 1972, and an assistant professor at Bucknell University from 1972 to 1974. In June 1974, he became an assistant professor at UMass Amherst. He has held various positions at the university since, apart from a gap between 1977 and 1981. Crotty become professor emeritus at the institution in June 2010.

== Analysis ==
Crotty's later research covered investment theory, the global economy, financial markets, the financial crisis, and the political economy of South Korea.

In 2016, he told Institute for New Economic Thinking that Keynes has been misrepresented, stating, "When Keynes ended the General Theory with a call for 'a more or less comprehensive socialization of investment' and the 'euthanasia of the rentier', it wasn't a tossed-off provocation, but a summary of a serious political program developed over decades."

== Publications ==
His writings have appeared in social science journals such as Monthly Review, the American Economic Review, the Review of Radical Political Economics, the Cambridge Journal of Economics, the Quarterly Journal of Economics, the Journal of Economic Literature, the Journal of Post Keynesian Economics, the Journal of Economic Issues, and in many edited collections.

In 2014, Salon magazine used Crotty and Gerald Epstein's research on an article on how in 2006 Goldman Sachs, Morgan Stanley and Bear Stearns made the majority of their profits on 'casino' activities.

=== Selected works ===
==== Books ====
- Keynes Against Capitalism: His Economic Case for Liberal Socialism (Routledge, 2019) ISBN 9781138612839
- Capitalism, Macroeconomics, and Reality: Understanding Globalization, Financialization, Competition, and Crisis (Edward Elgar, 2017) ISBN 9781784719012

==== Papers ====
- Avoiding another meltdown, with Gerald Epstein, (2009)

==== Chapters ====
- How big is too big? On the social efficiency of the financial sector in the United States in Capitalism on Trial, with Gerald Epstein (Edward Elgar Publishing, 2013) ISBN 978 1 78100 360 2
- The Centrality of Money, Credit and Financial Intermediation in Marx's Crisis Theory in Rethinking Marxism (Autonomedia, 1985) ISBN 0936756128
