= Exogenous and endogenous variables =

Classification of variables in economic models

In an economic model, an exogenous variable is one whose measure is determined outside the model and is imposed on the model. An exogenous change is a change in an exogenous variable. In contrast, an endogenous variable is a variable whose measure is determined by the model. An endogenous change is a change in an endogenous variable.

The term 'endogeneity' in econometrics has a related but distinct meaning. An endogenous random variable is correlated with the error term in the econometric model, while an exogenous variable is not.

== Examples ==
In the LM model of interest rate determination, the supply and demand for money determine the interest rate, contingent on the level of the money supply, so the money supply is an exogenous variable and the interest rate is an endogenous variable.

== Sub-models and models ==
An economic variable can be exogenous in some models and endogenous in others. In particular this can happen when one model also serves as a component of a broader model. For example, the IS model of only the goods market derives the market-clearing (and thus endogenous) level of output depending on the exogenously imposed level of interest rates, since interest rates affect the physical investment component of the demand for goods.

In contrast, the LM model of only the money market takes income (which identically equals output) as exogenously given and affecting money demand; here equilibrium of money supply and money demand endogenously determines the interest rate. When the IS model and the LM model are combined to give the IS-LM model, both the interest rate and output are endogenously determined.

== See also ==
- Cambridge capital controversy
- Endogenous money
