= Sidney Weintraub (economist, born 1914) =

American economist

- Born: April 28, 1914; New York City
- Died: June 19, 1983 (aged 69); Philadelphia

Academic work
- School or tradition: Post Keynesian economics
- Institutions: University of Pennsylvania; New York University; London School of Economics

Sidney Weintraub (/ˈwaɪntrɑːb/; April 28, 1914 – June 19, 1983) was an American economist, one of the most prominent American members of the Post Keynesian economics school. He was the co-founder and co-editor of The Journal of Post Keynesian Economics (1978). His views included criticism of monetarism and the neoclassical synthesis, and promotion of the tax-based incomes policy (TIP).

== Biography ==
After a year at the London School of Economics in 1938–39, Weintraub received a Ph.D. from New York University in 1941, and worked at the Federal Reserve Bank of New York until 1943, when he was drafted into the U.S. Army. In 1945 he joined the faculty of St. John's University in Brooklyn, New York. In 1950 he joined the faculty of the University of Pennsylvania. In 1957 he was awarded a Ford Foundation fellowship to travel to Europe. In 1969–70 he taught at the University of Waterloo. In 1972–3 he wrote a weekly column for the Philadelphia Bulletin. During his career he gave over 500 guest lectures in the U.S., Canada, and Europe, and published 18 books, 80+ scholarly articles, and 50+ popular articles. His students include Paul Davidson and Douglas Peters.

In August 1940 he married Sheila Tarlow.

He is the father of the mathematical economist E. Roy Weintraub.

== Publications ==
- Price Theory, 1949.
- Income and Employment Analysis, 1951.
- Approach to the Theory of Income Distribution, 1958.
- A General Theory of the Price Level, Output, Income Distribution, and Economic Growth. Philadelphia: Chilton Co. Book Division. 1959. Archived from the original on 2012-12-08 – via Questia.
- Classical Keynesianism, Monetary Theory, and the Price Level, 1961.
- A General Theory of the Price Level, 1959.
- A Tax-Based Incomes Policy (with Henry C. Wallich), Journal of Economic Issues, 1971.
- Keynes and the Monetarists (1973). 2nd ed. 1978.
- Weintraub, Sidney (1988), "A Jevonian Seditionist: Mutiny to Enhance the Economic Bounty", in Kregel, J. A. (ed.), Recollections of Eminent Economists, Washington Square: New York University Press, ISBN 0-8147-4599-7
