= Paolo Leon =

Italian economist (1935–2016)

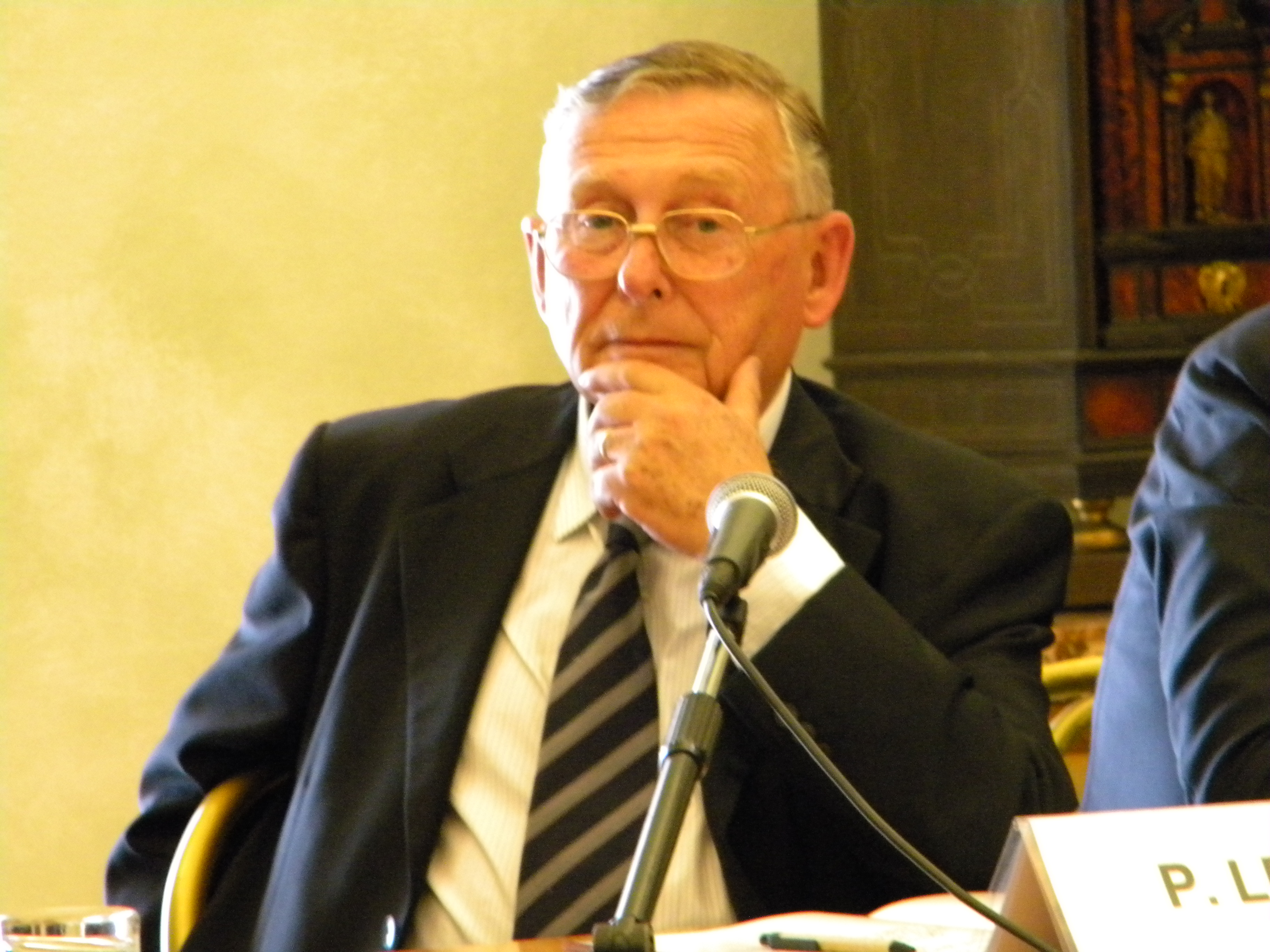
- Leon in 2011
- Born: 26 April 1935; Venice, Italy
- Died: 11 June 2016 (aged 81); Rome, Italy

Academic background
- Education: Sapienza University of Rome; King's College, Cambridge
- Influences: Richard Kahn

Academic work
- Discipline: Economics
- School or tradition: Post-Keynesian economics
- Institutions: University of Rome III
- Website: Information at IDEAS / RePEc

Paolo Leon (26 April 1935 – 11 June 2016) was an Italian Post Keynesian economist. He served from 1992 as Professor of Public Economics at the University of Rome III in Rome, Italy and then as emeritus professor. Before that, he was Assistant Professor of Development Economics at the University of Bologna, Professor of Economics at the University of Catania, Professor of Economic Policy at the High Institute of Public Administration in Rome and Professor of Regional and Location Economics at the Universities of Venice and Rome.

Leon studied law at Sapienza University of Rome and was a research student (1959) at King's College, Cambridge, where he was tutored by Richard Kahn. Between 1961 and 1968, he worked as an economist at the World Bank and left as Division Chief of the Economics Department. On returning to Italy, he worked as a consultant for a number of engineering firms, founded two private research companies (ARPES, 1970–1981, and CLES, 1982 to present) and was involved in benefit cost analysis of environment, cultural, training projects, studies of industrial districts and labor market analysis. He has been an expert for the European Union on many occasions and is editor of the journal Economia della Cultura.

Much of his work in applied economics was based on criticizing the U-turn in economics brought about by the policies of Margaret Thatcher and Ronald Reagan. He consulted central and regional governments, primarily on labor market regulations and showing that supply side policies in situations of deficient effective demand caused slow growth, useless government spending and increasing public debt.

== Main publications ==
His theoretical work started with articles and a book in Italian which was later translated into English (Structural Change and Growth in Capitalism) and much appreciated by Joan Robinson: the main point it made was that a dynamic economy does not exhibit uniform profit rates, because sectors do not grow uniformly (due to Engel's law and technical progress) and the capital needs of growing sectors necessarily imply higher profit rates than those of less dynamic sectors.

Later, he published L'economia della domanda effettiva (The Economics of Effective Demand) to show that it was the economy as a whole that determined agents' behavior, rather than the other way around, with reflections on how enterprises were influenced, in the division of their functions, by changes in the macroeconomy (the microfoundations of microeconomics).

His latest work (Stato, Mercato e Collettività – The State, the Market and the Community) has tried to establish the nature of the State as the agent of society (or of the community). The idea that markets can substitute the government, by limiting its activities to minimal tasks (defense, justice, police) and that economic policies are useless, does not square with the macrofoundation of microeconomics: no expectation is so rational as to take account of Kahn and Leontief multipliers, all counterintuitive macroeconomic laws.
