= Levy Economics Institute =

Nonprofit, nonpartisan public policy think tank

- Founded: 1986; 40 years ago
- Founder: Leon Levy
- Type: Think tank
- Location: Bard College, Annandale-on-Hudson, New York
- President: Pavlina R. Tcherneva
- Key people: Leon Botstein; Pavlina R. Tcherneva; Bruce C. Greenwald; Joseph Stiglitz; Martin L. Leibowitz; Lakshman Achuthan; William Julius Wilson; Dimitri B. Papadimitriou; Jan Kregel; Jerome Levy
- Website: https://www.levyinstitute.org/

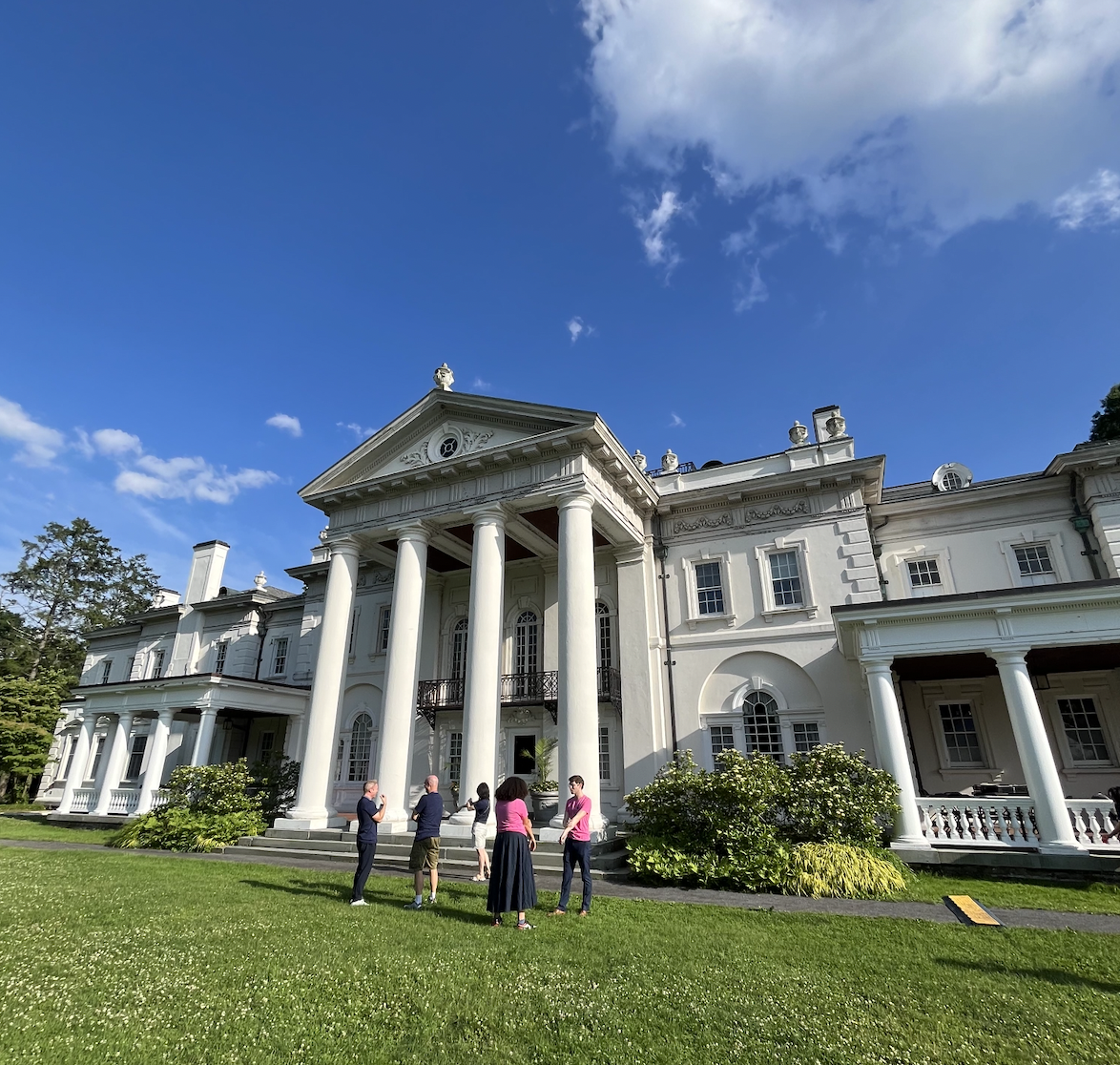
The Blithewood Building at Bard College, where the Levy Institute is housed.

Founded in 1986 as the Jerome Levy Economics Institute, the Levy Economics Institute of Bard College is a nonprofit, nonpartisan public policy think tank. The purpose of its research and other activities is to enable scholars and leaders in business, labor, and government to work together on problems of common interest. Its findings are disseminated—via publications, conferences, seminars, congressional testimony, and partnerships with other nonprofits—to a global audience of public officials, private sector executives, academics, and the general public. Through this process of scholarship, analysis, and informed debate, the Levy Institute generates public policy responses to economic problems.

The Levy Institute is housed on the campus of Bard College in Annandale-on-Hudson, New York, located 90 miles north of New York City. Blithewood, a Georgian-style manor at the campus's western edge, is the institute's main research and conference facility. Designed as a private residence by McKim, Mead and White alumnus Francis L. V. Hoppin, it was completed in 1900. The house and grounds, which includes an Italianate garden overlooking the Hudson River, were incorporated as part of Bard College in 1951.

== Current research ==
The Levy Institute has 18 scholars and 50 research associates. Their research focuses on such issues as stock-flow consistent macro modeling, monetary policy and financial structure, financial instability, income and wealth distribution, financial regulation and governance, gender equality and time poverty, and immigration/ethnicity and social structure. The Levy Institute is known for its research in heterodox economics, specifically in post-Keynesian and Marxian economics.

== Governance ==
The board of directors includes Leon Botstein, the president of Bard College; Bruce C. Greenwald and Joseph Stiglitz, both of Columbia University; Lakshman Achuthan, managing director of the Economic Cycle Research Institute; Martin L. Leibowitz, managing director of Morgan Stanley; William Julius Wilson of Harvard University; Pavlina Tcherneva, President of the Levy Institute; and Dimitri B. Papadimitriou, President Emeritus of the Levy Institute, Jerome Levy Professor of Economics and executive vice president of Bard College, and managing director of Bard College Berlin.

== Masters program ==
In the Autumn of 2014 the first class of students was admitted to the institute's Masters of Science in Economic Theory and Policy. The initial Director of the new program was Jan Kregel, he was succeeded by Thomas Masterson in 2022 when Profressor Kregel retired. The program is taught by Research Scholars at the institute.
