= Basil Moore =

Basil J Moore
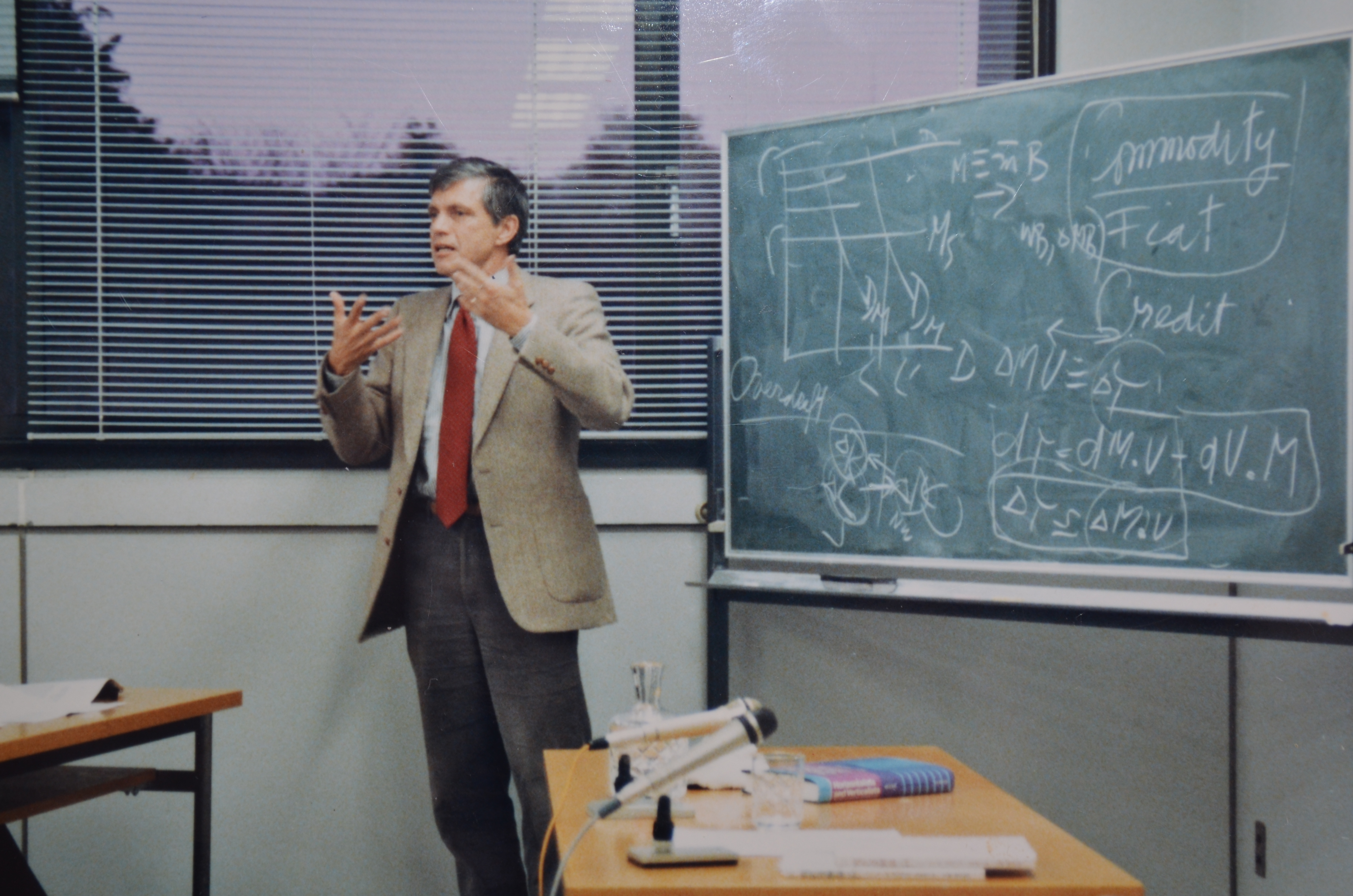
- Born: 6 June 1933; Toronto, Canada
- Died: 8 March 2018 (aged 84); Stellenbosch, South Africa

Academic work
- School or tradition: Post-Keynesian economics
- Notable ideas: Endogenous money theory
- Website: Information at IDEAS / RePEc

Basil John Moore (6 June 1933 - 8 March 2018) was a Canadian post-Keynesian economist, best known for developing and promoting endogenous money theory, particularly the proposition that the money supply curve is horizontal, rather than upward sloping, a proposition known as horizontalism. He was the most vocal proponent of this theory, and is considered a central figure in post Keynesian economics

Moore studied economics at the University of Toronto and at Johns Hopkins University. In 1958 he started a distinguished academic career at Wesleyan University in Middletown, Connecticut and became professor emeritus at the university. He left in 2003 to move to South Africa where he joined the University of Stellenbosch with which he had long maintained an association and, "where he was Professor Extraordinary of Economics."

== Theory ==
Moore emphasizes the mechanics of credit creation, particularly lines of credit extended by banks to large corporations on the money supply. He argues that the ability of commercial banks to extend credit is limited only by demand for money by creditworthy borrowers, as central banks are compelled to act to ensure there is always a sufficient supply of money for demand to be met (at their target interest rate).

Moore contrasted his own "horizontalist" view of the money supply, shared by some post-Keynesian economists, with a more mainstream "structuralist" view of the economy, in which the quantity of money is supply- constrained.

== Selected bibliography ==
- Shaking the Invisible Hand: Complexity, Endogenous Money and Exogenous Interest Rates, 2006, ISBN 978-0-230-51213-9
- Horizontalists and Verticalists: The Macroeconomics of Credit Money, 1988, ISBN 978-0-521-35079-2
- The Endogeneity of Money: A Comment, Scottish Journal of Political Economy, Scottish Economic Society, vol. 35(3), pp. 291–94, August, 1988.
- Inflation and financial deepening, Journal of Development Economics, Elsevier, vol. 20(1), pp. 125–133, 1986.
- Equities, Capital Gains, and the Role of Finance in Accumulation, American Economic Review, American Economic Association, vol. 65(5), pp. 872–86, December, 1975.
- The Pasinetti Paradox Revisited, Review of Economic Studies, Wiley Blackwell, vol. 41(2), pp. 297–99, April, 1974.
- Some Macroeconomic Consequences of Corporate Equities, Canadian Journal of Economics, Canadian Economics Association, vol. 6(4), pp. 529–44, November, 1973.
- Optimal Monetary Policy, Economic Journal, Royal Economic Society, vol. 82(325), pp. 116–39, March, 1972.
- Asset Management and Monetary Policy: Discussion, Journal of Finance, American Finance Association, vol. 24(2), pp. 242–44, May, 1969.
