= Philip Arestis =

British economist

Philip Arestis is a Cypriot-born British economist who has published widely in macroeconomics, monetary economics and applied economics. The approach he takes is typically Post-Keynesian.

== Editorships ==
Editor of the British Review of Economic Issues (BREI) (which became c1996 Economic Issues) 1982/1988

== Selected publications ==
- Arestis, P. (1992). The Post-Keynesian Approach to Economics: An Alternative Analysis of Economic Theory and Policy, Aldershot, Edward Elgar
- Arestis, P. (1996). Post-Keynesian economics: towards coherence. Cambridge Journal of Economics, 20(1), 111–135.
- Arestis, P., & Demetriades, P. (1997). Financial development and economic growth: assessing the evidence. The economic journal, 107(442), 783–799.
- Arestis, Philip and Malcolm C. Sawyer (ed.) (2001). A Biographical Dictionary of Dissenting Economists. New York: Edward Elgar Publishing
