= Paul Davidson (economist) =

American macroeconomist (1930–2024)

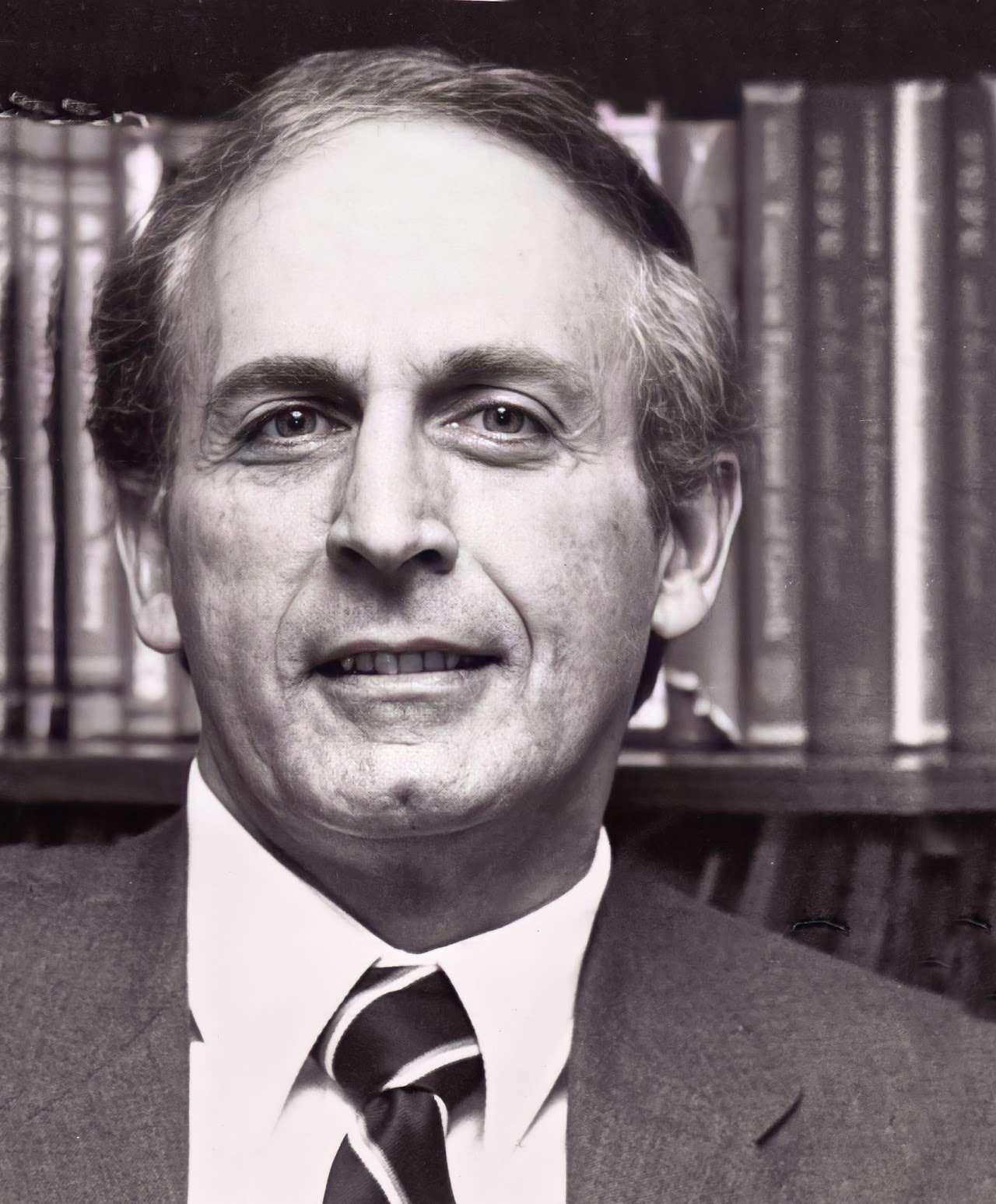
- Born: October 23, 1930; Brooklyn, New York, U.S.
- Died: June 20, 2024 (aged 93); Chicago, Illinois, U.S.

Academic background
- Education: Brooklyn College (BS); City University of New York (MBA); University of Pennsylvania (PhD)
- Influences: John Maynard Keynes, Sidney Weintraub

Academic work
- Discipline: Macroeconomics
- School or tradition: Post-Keynesian economics
- Notable ideas: Co-founding editor of the Journal of Post Keynesian Economics
- Website: pauldavidsoneconomist.com; Information at IDEAS / RePEc

Paul Davidson (October 23, 1930 – June 20, 2024) was an American macroeconomist who was one of the leading spokesmen of the American branch of the post-Keynesian school in economics. He actively intervened in important debates on economic policy (natural resources, international monetary system, developing countries' debt) from a position critical of mainstream economics.

== Early life ==
Davidson did not originally choose economics as a profession. His primary training was in both chemistry and biology, for which he received B.Sc. degrees from Brooklyn College in 1950. He was a graduate student in biochemistry at the University of Pennsylvania, but switched to economics, receiving his MBA from the City University of New York in 1955, and completing his PhD at the University of Pennsylvania in 1959.

J. Barkley Rosser Jr. from the Levy Economics Institute describes how, despite being accepted to graduate programs at Harvard, M.I.T., Berkeley and Brown, Davidson accepted an offer to the University of Pennsylvania which came with a generous financial aid package, which allowed him and his wife Louise, to start a family.

== Professional positions ==
During his seven decades as an economist, Davidson's professional positions included:

- Visiting Scholar, Schwartz Center For Economic Policy Analysis, New School 2004-2014
- Advisory Board, Institute for New Economic Thinking 2010-
- Holly Chair of Excellence in Political Economy, University of Tennessee 1986-2001
- Visiting Professor, University of Nice and Latapsis Research Institute (France) 1990
- Professor of Economics and associate director of the Bureau of Economic Research, Rutgers University 1966-1986
- Professor, International Summer School, Centro di Studi Economici Avanzati (Trieste) 1980-1992
- Visiting Professor, University of Strasbourg (France) 1986
- Visiting Professor, Institute for Advanced Studies (Vienna) 1980-84
- Co-Founding Editor, Journal of Post Keynesian Economics 1978-2014
- Chair, New Brunswick Department of Economics and Allied Sciences, Rutgers University 1975-1978
- Senior Visitor, University of Cambridge, Cambridge, England 1970-71
- Associate Professor of Economics, University of Pennsylvania 1963-1966
- Visiting Lecturer, University of Bristol, England 1964-65
- Assistant Professor, University of Pennsylvania 1961-63
- Assistant Director, Economics Division, Continental Oil Company (Conoco) 1960-61
- Assistant Professor, Rutgers University 1958-60
- Instructor in Economics, University of Pennsylvania 1955-58
- Instructor in Physiological Chemistry, University of Pennsylvania 1950-52

At Cambridge he worked with Joan Robinson to discuss draft chapters of his manuscript Money and the Real World. The discussions got very heated and she finally refused to speak to him about his work. Soon, when Davidson arrived at his office, he would often find a blank sheet of paper with a hand written question from her. He would spend the morning writing his answer and when Robinson went out for morning coffee, he would put the paper with his answer in her office. When Davidson returned to his office after lunch he would find Robinson's comments scrawled over the paper.

Davidson had a role in developing Environmental economics after his role as economic advisor to Continental Oil. Davidson was "nearly fired" when he forecast the company would do better if John F. Kennedy won the 1960 United States presidential election but when Kennedy won, though Davidson's counsel was more sought after by management, he and his wife, tired of the corporate environment, left to return to academia.

== Controversies ==
Paul Davidson warned of the impending subprime mortgage crisis in January 2008 and explicitly contested Alan Greenspan's recommendation for a market-based solution to let “housing prices (and security pegged to mortgages) fall until investors see them as bargains and start buying, stabilizing the economy,” instead accurately predicting that “if Congress does nothing, then a year from today we may be mired in the Greatest Recession since the Great Depression.” Ten months later when the economy collapsed, Greenspan admitted in Congressional testimony to be shocked that his free-market ideology was flawed.

== Congressional appearances ==
Davidson has appeared before United States congressional subcommittees and provided testimony twenty times from 1973 to 1985 mostly on energy and antitrust issues.

== Scholarly contributions ==
Davidson has authored or co-authored 22 books, including Who's Afraid of John Maynard Keynes? Challenging Economic Governance in an Age of Growing Inequality and hundreds of articles.

Davidson and Sidney Weintraub founded the Journal of Post Keynesian Economics in 1978. Davidson continued as editor of that journal until 2014. He was also a contributor to the Center for Full Employment and Stability. The CFEPS website (see Other Contributors: Paul Davidson) contains more biographical information about him, as well as a list of his publications, with links to a few.

Edward Elgar Publishing published a three-volume Essays in Honour of Paul Davidson series starting in 1996. They include

- Arestis, Philip (1996). Keynes, Money and the Open Economy. Essays in Honour of Paul Davidson: Volume One. Edward Elgar. ISBN 978-1-85898-312-7.
- Arestis, Philip (1997). Employment, Economic Growth and the Tyranny of the Market. Essays in Honour of Paul Davidson: Volume Two. Edward Elgar. ISBN 978-1-85898-313-4.
- Arestis, Philip (1999). Method, Theory and Policy in Keynes. Essays in Honour of Paul Davidson: Volume Three. Edward Elgar. ISBN 978-1-85898-626-5.

See comprehensive (but not complete) list of Paul Davidson publications list on / Google Scholar

== Death ==
Davidson died in Chicago on June 20, 2024, at the age of 93.

== Major publications ==
- Davidson, P. (1959). "A Clarification of the Ricardian Rent Share". The Canadian Journal of Economics and Political Science. 25 (2): 190–195. doi:10.2307/139062. JSTOR 139062.
- Davidson, P. (1960). "Increasing Employment, Diminishing Returns, Relative Shares, and Ricardo". The Canadian Journal of Economics and Political Science. 26 (1): 147–149. doi:10.2307/138826. JSTOR 138826.
- Theories of Aggregate Income Distribution, 1960
- Davidson, P. (1962). "More on the Aggregate Supply Function". The Economic Journal. 72 (286): 452–457. doi:10.2307/2228715. JSTOR 2228715.
- Davidson, P. (1962). "Income and Employment Multipliers, and the Price Level". The American Economic Review. 52 (4): 738–752. JSTOR 1808986.
- Davidson, P. (1963). "Public Policy Problems of the Domestic Crude Oil Industry". The American Economic Review. 53 (1): 85–108. JSTOR 1817130.
- Davidson, P.; Smolensky, E. (1964). "Modigliani on the Interaction of Monetary and Real Phenomena". The Review of Economics and Statistics. 46 (4): 429–431. doi:10.2307/1924053. JSTOR 1924053.
- Aggregate Supply and Demand Analysis, with E. Smolensky, 1964
- Davidson, P. (1965). "Keynes's Finance Motive". Oxford Economic Papers. 17 (1): 47–65. doi:10.1093/oxfordjournals.oep.a040978. JSTOR 2662469.
- Davidson, P. (1967). "The Importance of the Demand for Finance". Oxford Economic Papers. 19 (2): 245–253. doi:10.1093/oxfordjournals.oep.a041049. JSTOR 2662215.
- Davidson, P. (1967). "A Keynesian View of Patinkin's Theory of Employment". The Economic Journal. 77 (307): 559–578. doi:10.2307/2228991. JSTOR 2228991.
- "The Valuation of Public Goods," 1968, in Garnsey and Hibbs (eds.), Social Sciences and the Environment
- Davidson, P. (1968). "Money, Portfolio Balance, Capital Accumulation, and Economic Growth". Econometrica. 36 (2): 291–321. doi:10.2307/1907491. JSTOR 1907491.
- Davidson, P. (1968). "The Demand and Supply of Securities and Economic Growth and Its Implications for the Kaldor-Pasinetti Versus Samuelson-Modigliani Controversy". The American Economic Review. 58 (2): 252–269. JSTOR 1831814.
- Davidson, P. (1969). "A Keynesian View of the Relationship Between Accumulation, Money and the Money Wage-Rate". The Economic Journal. 79 (314): 300–323. doi:10.2307/2230170. JSTOR 2230170.
- Davidson, P. (1972). "Money and the Real World". The Economic Journal. 82 (325): 101–115. doi:10.2307/2230209. JSTOR 2230209.
- Davidson, P. (1972). "A Keynesian View of Friedman's Theoretical Framework for Monetary Analysis". The Journal of Political Economy. 80 (5): 864–882. doi:10.1086/259942. S2CID 153840242.
- Money and the Real World, 1972
- Davidson, P.; Weintraub, S. (1973). "Money as Cause and Effect". The Economic Journal. 83 (332): 1117–1132. doi:10.2307/2230844. JSTOR 2230844.
- "Market Disequilibrium Adjustments: Marshall Revisited," 1974, Econ Inquiry
- Davidson, P.; Falk, L. H.; Lee, H. (1974). "Oil: Its Time Allocation and Project Independence" (PDF). Brookings Papers on Economic Activity. 1974 (2): 411–448. doi:10.2307/2534193. JSTOR 2534193.
- "Post-Keynesian Monetary Theory and Inflation", 1977, in S. Weintraub (ed.), Modern Economic Thought
- "A Discussion of Leijonhufvud's Social Consequences of Inflation", 1977, in Harcourt (ed.), Microfoundations of Macroeconomics
- "The Carter Energy Proposal", 1977, Challenge
- "Money and General Equilibrium," 1977, Economie Appliquee
- Davidson, P. (1978). "Why Money Matters: Lessons from a Half-Century of Monetary Theory". Journal of Post Keynesian Economics. 1 (1): 46–70. doi:10.1080/01603477.1978.11489093. JSTOR 4537459.
- Davidson, P. (1978). "The United States Internal Revenue Service: Fourteenth Member of OPEC?". Journal of Post Keynesian Economics. 1 (2): 47–58. doi:10.1080/01603477.1978.11489101. JSTOR 4537469.
- "Post Keynesian Approach to the Theory of Natural Resources", 1979, Challenge
- "Monetary Policy, Regulation and International Adjustments," with M.A. Miles, 1979, Economies et Societies
- Davidson, P. (1979). "Oil Conservation: Theory vs. Policy". Journal of Post Keynesian Economics. 2 (1): 145–149. doi:10.1080/01603477.1979.11489145. JSTOR 4537519.
- "What Is the Energy Crisis?", 1979, Challenge
- "Keynes's Paradigm: A Theoretical Framework for Monetary Analysis", with J.A. Kregel, 1980, in Nell (ed.), Growth, Property and Profits
- Davidson, P. (1980). "The Dual-Faceted Nature of the Keynesian Revolution: Money and Money Wages in Unemployment and Production Flow Prices". Journal of Post Keynesian Economics. 2 (3): 291–307. doi:10.1080/01603477.1980.11489160. JSTOR 4537535.
- "Keynes's Theory of Employment, Expectations and Indexing", 1980, Revista de Economia Latinoamericana
- "Post Keynesian Economics: Solving the Crisis in Economic Theory", 1981, in Bell and Kristol (eds.), The Crisis in Economic Theory
- Davidson, P.; Lindholm, R. W. (1981). "Can VAT Resolve the Shortage of Savings (SOS) Distress? [with Rejoinder]". Journal of Post Keynesian Economics. 4 (1): 51–62. doi:10.1080/01603477.1981.11489259. JSTOR 4537635.
- "Alfred Marshall is Alive and Well in Post Keynesian Economics", 1981, IHS Journal
- "A Critical Analysis of the Monetarist-Rational Expectations Supply Side (Incentive) Economics Approach to Accumulation During a Period of Inflationary Expectations," 1981, Kredit und Kapital
- International Money and the Real World, 1982
- Davidson, P. (1982). "Rational Expectations: A Fallacious Foundation for Studying Crucial Decision-Making Processes". Journal of Post Keynesian Economics. 5 (2): 182–198. doi:10.1080/01603477.1982.11489355. JSTOR 4537730.
- "Monetarism and Reagonomics", 1983, in S. Weintraub and Goodstein (eds.), Reagonomics in the Stagflation Economy
- Davidson, P. (1983). "Keynes's General Theory: A Different Perspective". Journal of Economic Literature. 21 (1): 52–56. JSTOR 2724747.
- Davidson, P. (1983). "The Marginal Product Curve is Not the Demand Curve for Labor and Lucas's Labor Supply Function is Not the Supply Curve for Labor in the Real World". Journal of Post Keynesian Economics. 6 (1): 105–117. doi:10.1080/01603477.1983.11489420. JSTOR 4537796.
- Davidson, P. (1983). "An Appraisal of Weintraub's Work". Eastern Economic Journal. 9 (4): 291–294. JSTOR 40325122.
- Davidson, P. (1984). "Reviving Keynes's Revolution". Journal of Post Keynesian Economics. 6 (4): 561–575. doi:10.1080/01603477.1984.11489467. JSTOR 4537848.
- "The Conventional Wisdom on Deficits Is Wrong", 1984, Challenge
- "Incomes Policy as a Social Institution", 1985, in Maital and Lipnowski (eds.), Macroeconomic Conflict and Social Institutions
- "Policies For Prices And Incomes", 1985, in Barrere (ed.), Keynes Today
- "Financial Markets and Williamson's Theory of Governance: Efficiency vs. Concentration vs. Power", with G.S. Davidson, 1984, Quarterly Review of Economics and Business
- Davidson, P. (1985). "Liquidity and Not Increasing Returns is the Ultimate Source of Unemployment Equilibrium". Journal of Post Keynesian Economics. 7 (3): 373–384. doi:10.1080/01603477.1985.11489512. JSTOR 4537895.
- Davidson, P. (1985). "Can Effective Demand and the Movement toward Further Income Equality Be Maintained in the Face of Robotics? An Introduction". Journal of Post Keynesian Economics. 7 (3): 422–425. doi:10.1080/01603477.1985.11489517. JSTOR 4537900.
- Davidson, P. (1985). "Sidney Weintraub: An Economist of the Real World". Journal of Post Keynesian Economics. 7 (4): 533–539. doi:10.1080/01603477.1985.11489529. JSTOR 4537915.
- "A Post Keynesian View of Theories and Causes of High Real Interest Rates", 1986, Thames Papers in Political Economy
- Davidson, P. (1986). "Finance, Funding, Saving, and Investment". Journal of Post Keynesian Economics. 9 (1): 101–110. doi:10.1080/01603477.1986.11489603. JSTOR 4537993.
- Davidson, P. (1986). "The Simple Macroeconomics of a Nonergodic Monetary Economy versus a Share Economy: Is Weitzman's Macroeconomics too Simple?". Journal of Post Keynesian Economics. 9 (2): 212–225. doi:10.1080/01603477.1986.11489614. JSTOR 4538004.
- "Financial Markets, Investment, and Employment", 1988, in Matzner et al. (eds.), Barriers to Full Employment
- Davidson, P. (1987). "Sensible Expectations and the Long-Run Non-Neutrality of Money". Journal of Post Keynesian Economics. 10 (1): 146–153. doi:10.1080/01603477.1987.11489666. JSTOR 4538058.
- Davidson, P. (1987). "A Modest Set of Proposals for Resolving the International Debt Problem". Journal of Post Keynesian Economics. 10 (2): 323–338. doi:10.1080/01603477.1987.11489682. JSTOR 4538074.
- "Weitzman's Share Economy And The Aggregate Supply Function", 1988, in Hamouda and Smithin (eds.), Keynes and Public Policy After Fifty Years
- "Endogenous Money, The Production Process, And Inflation Analysis", 1988, Economie Appliquee
- "A Technical Definition of Uncertainty and the Long Run Non- Neutrality of Money", 1988, Cambridge JE
- Economics for a Civilized Society, with G. Davidson, 1988
- "Keynes and Money" 1989, in Hill (ed.), Keynes, Money, and Monetarism
- "Prices and Income Policy: An Essay in Honor of Sidney Weintraub", 1989, in Barrere (ed.), Money, Credit, and Prices in Keynesian Perspective
- "Patinkin's Interpretation of Keynes and the Keynesian Cross", 1989, HOPE
- Davidson, P. (1989). "Only in America: Neither the Homeless nor the Yachtless Are Economic Problems". Journal of Post Keynesian Economics. 12 (1): 164–166. doi:10.1080/01603477.1989.11489788. JSTOR 4538179.
- "The Economics of Ignorance Or Ignorance of Economics?", 1989, Critical Review
- "Shackle and Keynes vs. Rational Expectations Theory on the Role of Time, Liquidity, and Financial Markets" 1990, in S. Frowen (ed.), Unknowledge and Choice in Economics
- "Liquidity Proposals for a New Bretton Woods Plan", 1990, in Barrere, Keynesian Economic Policies
- "On Thirlwall's Law", 1990, Revista de Economia Politica
- Collected Writings of Paul Davidson (2 vols.), 1990–1.
- Controversies in Post Keynesian Economics, 1991
- Davidson, P. (1990). "A Post Keynesian Positive Contribution to "Theory"". Journal of Post Keynesian Economics. 13 (2): 298–303. doi:10.1080/01603477.1990.11489849. JSTOR 4538242.
- "Is Probability Theory Relevant For Choice Under Uncertainty?: A Post Keynesian Perspective", 1991, JEP
- "What Kind of International Payments System Would Keynes Have Recommended for the Twenty-First Century?" 1991, in Davidson and Kregel (eds.), Economic Problems of the 1990s
- "Money: Cause or Effect? Exogenous or Endogenous?", 1992, in Nell and Semmler (eds.), Nicholas Kaldor and Mainstream Economics
- "Eichner's Approach to Money and Macroeconomics", 1992, in Milberg (ed.), The Megacorp and Macrodynamics
- Davidson, P. (1992). "Reforming the World's Money". Journal of Post Keynesian Economics. 15 (2): 153–179. doi:10.1080/01603477.1992.11489932. JSTOR 4538333.
- Davidson, P. (1993). "The Elephant and the Butterfly: Or Hysteresis and Post Keynesian Economics". Journal of Post Keynesian Economics. 15 (3): 309–322. doi:10.1080/01603477.1993.11489946. JSTOR 4538348.
- Davidson, P. (1992). "Would Keynes Be a new Keynesian?". Eastern Economic Journal. 18 (4): 449–463. JSTOR 40325476.
- "Asset Deflation and Financial Fragility" 1993, in Arestis (ed.), Contemporary Issues in Money and Banking
- Can the Free Market Pick Winners? (editor), 1993
- Growth, Employment and Finance: Economic Reality and Economic Theory, (co-edited with J.A. Kregel), 1994
- "The Asimakopulos View of Keynes's General Theory", 1994, in Harcourt and Roncaglia (eds.), Investment and Employment in Theory and Practice
- "Monetary Theory and Policy In A Global Context With A Large International Debt" 1994, in Frowen (ed.), Monetary Theory and Monetary Policy
- Post Keynesian Macroeconomic Theory: a foundation for successful economic policies for the Twenty-first Century, 1994
- Economics For A Civilized Society, with Greg Davidson, 1996.
- "What Are The Essential Characteristics of Post Keynesian Monetary Theory?", 1996, in G. Deleplace and E. J. Nell (eds.), Money in Motion
- "The General Theory in An Open Economy," 1996, in Harcourt and Riach (eds.), A Second Edition of the General Theory
- Davidson, P. (1996). "Reality and Economic Theory". Journal of Post Keynesian Economics. 18 (4): 479–508. doi:10.1080/01603477.1996.11490083. JSTOR 4538504.
- Davidson, P. (1997). "Are Grains of Sand in the Wheels of International Finance Sufficient to do the Job when Boulders are Often Required?". The Economic Journal. 107 (442): 671–686. doi:10.1111/1468-0297.00183.
- Davidson, P. (1998). "Post Keynesian Employment Analysis and the Macroeconomics of OECD Unemployment". The Economic Journal. 108 (448): 817–831. doi:10.1111/1468-0297.00317.
- "Is a Plumber Or A Financial Architect Needed to End Global International Liquidity Problems?", 2000, World Development
- Financial Markets, Money and the Real World, 2002
- Davidson, P. (2003). "Are Fixed Exchange Rates the Problem and Flexible Exchange Rates the Cure?". Eastern Economic Journal. 29 (2): 259–268. JSTOR 40325413.
- Davidson, P. (2003). "Is "Mathematical Science" an Oxymoron when Used to Describe Economics?". Journal of Post Keynesian Economics. 25 (4): 527–545. JSTOR 4538847.
- Davidson, P. (2003). "Setting the Record Straight on "A History of Post Keynesian Economics"". Journal of Post Keynesian Economics. 26 (2): 245–272. JSTOR 4538872.
- "The Post Keynesian School", Snowden and Vane (eds.) Modern Macroeconomics, 2005
- Davidson, P. (2005). "Responses to Lavoie, King, and Dow on what Post Keynesianism is and who is a Post Keynesian". Journal of Post Keynesian Economics. 27 (3): 393–408. doi:10.1080/01603477.2005.11051447. JSTOR 4538934. S2CID 152828773.
- Davidson, P. (2005). "Galbraith and the Post Keynesians". Journal of Post Keynesian Economics. 28 (1): 103–113. JSTOR 4538962.
- "Can, Or Should, A Central Bank Inflation Target?" 2006, JPKE
- "Keynes and Money" in Arestis and Sawyer (eds.) Handbook of Alternative Monetary Economics, 2006
- "Keynes, Post Keynesian Analysis, and the Open Economies of the Twenty-first Century" Arestis, McCombie and Vickerman (eds.) Growth and Economic Development, 2006
- "Are We Making Progress Towards A Civilized Society?", 2007, JPKE
- John Maynard Keynes, 2007
- "How To Solve The U.S. Housing Problem and Avoid A Recession: A Revived HOLC and FTC", Schwartz Center For Economic Policy Analysis: Policy Note, 2008.
- "Securitization, Liquidity, and Market Failure", 2008, Challenge
- "Is The Current Financial Distress Caused By The Sub Prime Mortgage Crisis A Minsky moment? Or Is It The Result of Attempting To Securitize Illiquid Non Commercial Mortgage Loans?", 2008, JPKE
- The Keynes Solution: The Path to Global Economic Prosperity, 2009
- Davidson, Paul (2007). John Maynard Keynes (PDF). Great Thinkers in Economics Series. Basingstoke, England: Palgrave Macmillan. ISBN 9780230229204. Archived from the original (PDF) on August 19, 2016.

Girón, Alicia (January 2009). "Review of John Maynard Keynes by Davidson, Paul (2007) in Great Thinkers in Economics Series, Palgrave, Macmillan, England". Ola Financiera (in Spanish). 2: 134–136. Pdf.

- Davidson, Paul (2007). Who's Afraid of John Maynard Keynes?. Palgrave Macmillan. ISBN 978-3-319-64503-2.
