= Pluralism in economics =

Movement within an academic discipline

The pluralism in economics movement is a campaign to change the teaching and research in economics towards more openness in its approaches, topics and standpoints it considers. The goal of the movement is to "reinvigorate the discipline ... [and bring] economics back into the service of society". Some have argued that economics had greater scientific pluralism in the past compared to the monist approach that is prevalent today. Pluralism encourages the inclusion of a wide variety of neoclassical and heterodox economic theories—including classical, Post-Keynesian, institutional, ecological, evolutionary, feminist, Marxist, and Austrian economics, stating that "each tradition of thought adds something unique and valuable to economic scholarship".

== History ==
Critics of mainstream economics have called for a reform of the discipline in the past. The movement for pluralism can therefore be traced to wider movements for progressive change in the 1960s and 1970s, with economists like Frank Stilwell and Steve Keen campaigning for pluralist and critical economics teaching at the University of Sydney in 1971. In 1992, a petition organised by Geoffrey Hodgson, Uskali Mäki, and Deirdre McCloskey was published as a paid advertisement in The American Economic Review. The petition described itself as a "plea for a pluralistic and rigorous economics" and was preceded by a commission of the American Economic Association entitled "Report by the Commission on Graduate Education". In 2000, students at the École Normale Supérieure protested and announced the creation of the post-autistic economics movement. Similarly, students at the University of Cambridge and University of Missouri-Kansas City organised petitions in 2001 and in 2011 the Cambridge Society for Economic Pluralism was formed to promote pluralist thinking and pushing for curriculum reform within the university. In 2009, the Foundation for European Economic Development (FEED) organised a plea for economic pluralism with over 2,000 signatures in the first month. In addition, the first Volume of the International Journal of Pluralism and Economics Education was founded and published along with the Handbook for Pluralist Economics Education.

Economists Paul Krugman and Richard Layard organised a "Manifesto For Economic Sense" in 2012. The Post-Crash Economics Society Manchester published a petition in November 2013 and was involved in setting up Rethinking Economics. They also devised a course entitled "Bubbles, Panics and Crashes: an Introduction to Alternative Theories of Crisis", which the economic department rejected. Student groups in the United Kingdom published a draft manifesto in April 2014. On May 5, 2014, economics students from nineteen countries published an international student letter and formed the International Student Initiative for Pluralist Economics. The students called for pluralism of theories and methods to provide economics students with an understanding of the broader social and moral implications of economic decisions.

== See also ==
- Foundations of Real-World Economics
- Foundation for European Economic Development
- Heterodox Economics
- History of economic thought
- Humanistic economics
- International Student Initiative for Pluralist Economics
- Post-autistic economics
- Real-world economics
- Real-world economics review
- The Economics Anti-Textbook
