= Anti-capitalism =

Political ideology and movement opposed to capitalism

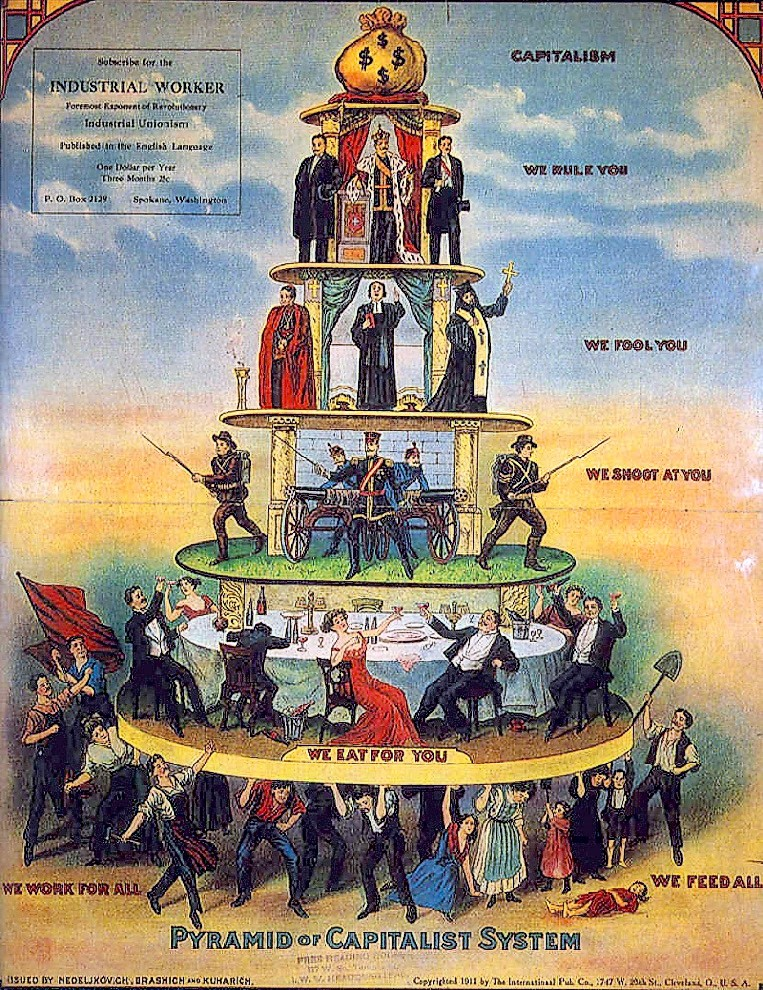
The "Pyramid of Capitalist System" cartoon made by the Industrial Workers of the World (1911) is an example of a socialist critique of capitalism and of social stratification.

Anti-capitalism is a political ideology and movement encompassing a variety of attitudes and ideas that oppose capitalism. Anti-capitalists seek to combat the worst effects of capitalism and to eventually replace capitalism with alternative economic systems such as socialism, communism, or anarchy.

== Characteristics ==
Anti-capitalism can range from a reformist position, which aims to limit corporate power and oppose neoliberal policies, to a radical position, which entirely rejects capitalism and seeks to replace the existing social order. Key principles of anti-capitalism, as outlined by the charter of the World Social Forum, include a committent to democracy and egalitarianism. Anti-capitalists view capitalism either as a social relation or as a distinct economic and political system, and how they view it informs their methods of opposing it. Reformist anti-capitalism places itself in opposition to specific economic practices, including commodification and capital accumulation, and seeks to combat the negative externalities of capitalism without fundamentally altering the economic system; on the other hand, forms of revolutionary socialism see capitalism as a fundamentally flawed social system that needs to be overthrown and replaced. Although the reformist and revolutionary perspectives differ, they are not necessarily distinct, with anti-capitalists often taking aspects of one or the other depending on the material conditions they are faced with.

Various economic systems have been proposed as an alternative to capitalism. American economist Michael Albert proposed a system of participatory economics, a kind of democratic socialism which would involve social ownership, workers' self-management, participatory planning and system of remuneration based on contribution, among other factors. Neozapatismo emphasises the self-determination of indigenous peoples and a form of participatory democracy that stands in contrast to the centralisation and vanguardism of authoritarian socialist tendencies.

== History ==
Early opposition to the rise of capitalism first arose during the 17th century, when feudal landowners first came under threat from the increasing power of business owners. During the 19th century, the Industrial Revolution gave rise to mass production, which accelerated the shift away from mercantilism as the predominant economic system and the globalization of capitalism. The division of labour within this industrial capitalist economy led to the rapid growth of the working class, who were increasingly drawn towards anti-capitalism and organised themselves in trade unions and socialist parties.

== Contemporary anti-capitalist movement ==
=== 1960s–1980s ===
Contemporary anti-capitalism finds its roots among the New Left and the counterculture of the 1960s, which infused anti-capitalism with a postmodern tendency by the end of the Cold War. During this period, anti-capitalism began to develop within the environmental movement, with green politics drawing a lot of its influence from the New Left and groups such as Greenpeace aligning themselves against economic growth and pioneering new methods of direct action which had previously been advocated by anarchists. Radical environmentalists such as Earth First, which infused their green politics with anti-capitalism, used decentralised clandestine cell systems to carry out large-scale acts of sabotage; tactics which would later be taken up by the wider anti-capitalist movement. Capitalism was increasingly seen as responsible for environmental degradation, leading to the adoption of anti-capitalism by those who aimed to stop it.

=== 1990s ===
Since the 1970s, successive governments around the world carried out the widespread privatisation of the public sector, often despite popular opposition. By the 1990s, neoliberalism had asserted a hegemonic influence over the global economy. In reaction against the rise of neoliberalism, a new anti-capitalist movement began to take shape. The contemporary anti-capitalist movement first emerged in January 1994, with the Zapatista uprising against the implementation of the North American Free Trade Agreement (NAFTA). Zapatista spokesperson Subcomandante Marcos explicitly expressed solidarity with minority groups throughout the world, seeking to make a common cause with others who experienced oppression under globalized capitalism. The Zapatista autonomous region in Chiapas inspired a new generation of anti-capitalists worldwide. Anti-capitalists began to defend cultural pluralism and stand in solidarity with indigenous rights movements, breaking from the 20th century's anti-capitalist movement, which had few links with the decolonial and anti-racist movements of its period.

In 1995, the establishment of the World Trade Organization (WTO), which sought to promote a neoliberal policy of economic globalization, met with opposition from the nascent anti-globalization movement (also known as the alter-globalization movement or global justice movement). Other opponents of neoliberal globalization included nationalists and religious fundamentalists, although these tendencies differed widely from anti-capitalism in their principles and objectives. The anti-capitalist movement provided a militant opposition to the WTO and its General Agreement on Trade in Services, distinguishing their progressive politics from the prevailing liberal democratic politics which upheld these institutions and had resigned to a belief that no alternative existed. English philosopher Mark Fisher referred to this phenomenon as capitalist realism.

Towards the end of the 1990s, the British environmentalist group Reclaim the Streets sought to build ties with the anti-globalisation movement, culminating with the Carnival Against Capital on 18 June 1999 in London. Although the protest precipitated a decline in the British anti-capitalist movement, following the rise of Tony Blair's New Labour government, it also renewed contacts within the international anti-capitalist movement and accelerated a shift towards revolutionary anti-capitalism. During the late 1990s, confrontations between militant anti-capitalists and the police became commonplace at G8 summits and WTO conferences, which were regularly targeted for protests by a diverse and decentralised coalition of organisations. The largest of these were the 1999 Seattle WTO protests, where anarchists, environmentalists and trade unionists caused conference negotiations to collapse; this inspired a new wave of anti-capitalist activism in the 21st century, with large protests taking place against the 26th G8 summit in Prague and the 27th G8 summit in Genoa.

=== 2000s ===
The wave of summit protests that began in the late 1990s culminated at the 31st G8 summit in Scotland, where the Make Poverty History campaign pressured world leaders to support fair trade and debt relief for least developed countries, winning the support of UK prime minister Gordon Brown. It also resulted in the beginning of the Live 8 benefit concert, which aimed to raise awareness of the G8's activities. Despite both campaigns achieving some minor debt relief measures, most anti-capitalists expressed disappointment that no major reform took place and concluded that the campaigns had not achieved their goals. Public support for a reversal of neoliberalism and the weakening of international financial institutions had been demonstrated, but mainstream centre-left political parties and NGOs continued to work under the assumption that such institutions would themselves seek to implement the public's preferred policies. Moderate parties such as the American Democratic Party and the British Labour Party reconciled with neoliberalism, while the influence of more left-wing parties such as the French Socialist Party and the Social Democratic Party of Germany were weakened during this period.

European anti-capitalists considered governments and financial institutions to be representatives of corporations and the wealthy, not the general public. Anti-capitalists began to question what would be done if these institutions did not implement the reforms desired by the general public and whether another way of doing politics was necessary to accomplish their goals. As they believed reforms were not possible within existing institutions, they called for the formation of a mass movement to establish new institutions of democracy and popular sovereignty. Such action gained the support of anti-capitalist organisations such as the British World Development Movement, the Dutch Transnational Institute and the French Association for the Taxation of Financial Transactions and for Citizens' Action (ATTAC), the latter of which called for a tax on currency trading to alleviate poverty and restrain the power of financial institutions. Green parties came to constitute the main political expression of anti-capitalism in Europe, but remained a relatively small current of mainstream politics. Most Europeans were not convinced to vote for the anti-capitalist parties, despite popular opposition to neoliberalism. In France, although ATTAC and the broader anti-capitalist movement played a prominent role in the defeat of the 2005 French European Constitution referendum, they were not able to prevent the 2007 election of the neoliberal Nicolas Sarkozy. Only Italy saw success for an anti-capitalist political party, with the Communist Refoundation Party being elected to form part of a left-wing coalition government in 2006.

In contrast, Latin America observed a widespread leftward shift throughout the 2000s, with the elections of Hugo Chávez in Venezuela in 1998, Luiz Inácio Lula da Silva in Brazil in 2002, Néstor Kirchner in Argentina in 2003 and Evo Morales in Bolivia in 2005. The United States, which had previously suppressed left-wing governments in Latin America, was too preoccupied with the War on terror to challenge these new governments or their policies of nationalisation. An attempted coup against Chávez in 2002, allegedly backed by the United States, failed due to the popular support for his anti-capitalist policies. Lula's Workers' Party (PT) also experimented with new forms of political organisation, with the PT government of Porto Alegre establishing a novel participatory budgeting system. Such initiatives gained the support of ATTAC, which together with the Porto Alegre government, organised the first World Social Forum (WSF), conceived as an anti-capitalist alternative to the World Economic Forum. These forums attracted participation from trade unions, political parties, social movements and governments, which discussed the organisation of the global anti-capitalist movement through deliberative democracy. The first meeting of the WSF, held in Porto Alegre in 2001, was attended by 12,000 delegates; attendance grew to 100,000 delegates at the 2004 Mumbai forum and 155,000 at the 2005 Porto Alegre forum. In 2006, the Forum was reorganized to be polycentric, with local events taking place in Mali, Pakistan and Venzuela, while smaller local events were also held in Italy. The anti-capitalist movement grew throughout the Global South during this period, with mass movements to organise workers and landless peasants such as the Via Campesina forming.

The spread of internet access during the 2000s also led to the establishment of alternative media networks by the anti-capitalist movement. Groups such as Indymedia and Undercurrents formed new infrastructure for open access citizen journalism, which mainly concentrated its reporting on events, actions and campaigns, rather than wider political or cultural issues. Anti-capitalists also formed traditional media organizations, such as the American ZNetwork, British New Internationalist magazine and French Le Monde diplomatique. Anti-capitalist cultural activists engaged in culture jamming, with groups like Adbusters altering advertisements to spread anti-capitalist political messages. They objected to the capitalist practice of branding as a new kind of meta-commodity, and drew attention to how recognised brand names often relied upon sweatshop labour. Anti-capitalist media gained mainstream appeal during this period, with the writings of Naomi Klein, documentaries of Michael Moore and the music of Rage Against the Machine generating widespread attention. Corporate power was at the centre of anti-capitalist media's critique, while aspects of popular culture were rarely engaged with.

== See also ==
- Accumulation by dispossession
- Anti-Capitalist Convergence
- Anti-consumerism
- Anti-system politics
- Anti-politics
- Christian views on poverty and wealth
- Fascist economy
- Degrowth
- Distributism
- Eye of a needle
- Foundations of Real-World Economics
- Humanistic economics
- Islamic views on poverty
- List of anti-capitalist and communist parties with national parliamentary representation
- New Anticapitalist Party
- Post-capitalism
- Real utopias
- Real-world economics
- Religious economy
- Religious views on capitalism
- Social democracy
- Solidarity economy
- Syndicalism

== Bibliography ==
- Fisher, Mark (2009). Capitalist Realism: Is There No Alternative?. John Hunt Publishing. ISBN 978-1846943171.
- Gilbert, Jeremy (2008). "Another World Is Possible: The Anti-Capitalist Movement". Anticapitalism and culture: radical theory and popular politics. Berg. pp. 75–106. ISBN 978-1-84788-451-0.
- Latham, Robert (2018). "Contemporary capitalism, uneven development, and the arc of anti-capitalism". Global Discourse. 8 (2): 169–186. doi:10.1080/23269995.2018.1461339.
- Wallerstein, Immanuel (September 1974). "The Rise and Future Demise of the World Capitalist System: Concepts for Comparative Analysis". Comparative Studies in Society and History. 16 (4): 387–415. doi:10.1017/S0010417500007520. S2CID 73664685.
