= The Econocracy (book) =

Economics book

The Econocracy: the perils of leaving economics to the experts is a 2017 book by Joe Earle, Cahal Moran and Zach Ward-Perkins that argues that the United Kingdom has become an econocracy, a society in which improving the economy has become the main purpose of politics. They demonstrate how this undermines democracy, in turn increasing the power and authority of economists. The authors see this as societally damaging because of the problematic state of the discipline of economics.

The book includes interviews with student organisers and a curriculum review of university economics education at seven universities across the UK. The authors are part of the globally active International Student Initiative for Pluralist Economics, which became Rethinking Economics in the UK. The movement campaigns for pluralism in economics and seeks to democratise economics.

== Reception ==
Aditya Chakrabortty reviewed the book positively in the Guardian calling the book ‘a case study for the question we should all be asking since the crash: how have the elites - in Westminster, in the City, in economics - stayed in charge?'. Diane Coyle, economist and former vice-Chair of the BBC Trust, reviewed the book on her blog giving a mixed response. Ha-Joon Chang, author of Economics: The user’s guide, called the book 'Utterly compelling and sobering.'. Martin Wolf, Chief Economics Commentator at the Financial Times, put the book on his ‘Summer books of 2017: Economics’ list. The historian David Kynaston named the book as one of his ‘Best Books of 2016’ in the Guardian calling it ‘a remarkable, perhaps game-changing contribution by three young Manchester graduates.’.

== See also ==
- Pluralism in economics
- Econocracy
