= Real-World Economics Review =

- Discipline: Economics
- Language: English
- Edited by: Edward Fullbrook

Publication details
- Former names: Post-Autistic Economics Review, Post-Autistic Economics Newsletter
- History: 2000–present
- Publisher: Post-Autistic Economics Network
- Open access: Yes

Standard abbreviations
- ISO 4: Real-World Econ. Rev.

Indexing
- ISSN: 2055-3668
- OCLC no.: 367587215

Links
- Journal homepage

Real-World Economics Review is a peer-reviewed open access academic journal of heterodox economics published by the "Post-Autistic Economics Network". It was known formerly as the Post-Autistic Economics Review and the Post-Autistic Economics Newsletter. Previous issues are archived on its website. Two sister journals from the same publisher are Economic Thought and World Economics Review.

First published as a newsletter in September 2000, the journal associated with the World Economics Association in 2011. Presently it publishes articles focused on economic, political, and social issues. As it is part of the post-autistic economics movement, it heavily criticizes neoclassical economics. It accepts contributions from diverse schools of economic thought.

== See also ==
- Real-world economics
- List of open access journals
- Review of Radical Political Economics
- Foundations of Real-World Economics
- Humanistic economics
- Heterodox economics
