= Allied Social Science Associations =

Umbrella group for American academic organizations

The Allied Social Science Associations (ASSA) is a group of academic and professional organizations that are officially recognized by the American Economic Association (AEA) and are related to the study of social sciences. As of 2007, there are fifty organizations that participate in the annual meetings of the ASSA, including:

- Agricultural & Applied Economics Association (AAEA)
- American Committee on Asian Economic Studies (ACAES)
- American Economic Association (AEA)
- American Finance Association (AFA)
- African Finance and Economics Association (AFEA)
- American Real Estate and Urban Economics Association (AREUEA)
- American Society of Hispanic Economists (ASHE)
- Association of Christian Economics (ACE)
- Association for Comparative Economic Studies (ACES)
- Association for Economic and Development Studies on Bangladesh (AEDSB)
- Association of Environmental and Resource Economists (AERE)
- Association for Evolutionary Economics (AFEE)
- Association of Financial Economists (AFE)
- Association of Indian Economic Studies (AIES)
- Association for Social Economics (ASE)
- Association for the Study of the Cuban Economy (ASCE)
- Association for the Study of Generosity in Economics (ASGE; formerly the Association for the Study of the Grants Economy)
- Chinese Economic Association in North America (CEANA)
- Chinese Economist Society (CES)
- Cliometric Society (CS)
- Econometric Society (ES)
- Economic History Association (EHA)
- Economic Science Association (ESA)
- Economists for Peace and Security (EPS)
- Health Economics Research Programme (HERO)
- History of Economics Society (HES)
- Industrial Organization Society (IOS)
- International Association for Energy Economics (IAEE)
- International Association for Feminist Economics (IAFFE)
- International Economics and Finance Society (IEFS)
- International Health Economics Association (IHEA)
- International Network for Economic Methodology (INEM)
- International Society for Inventory Research (ISIR)
- International Society for New Institutional Economics (ISNIE)
- International Trade and Finance Association (ITFA)
- The Korea-America Economic Association (KAEA)
- Labor and Employment Relations Association (LERA)
- Middle East Economic Association (MEEA)
- National Association for Business Economics (NABE)
- National Association of Economic Educators (NAEE)
- National Association of Forensic Economics (NAFE)
- National Council on Economic Education (NCEE)
- National Economic Association (NEA)
- National Tax Association (NTA)
- North American Economics and Finance Association (NAEFA)
- Omicron Delta Epsilon (ODE)
- Peace Science Society International (PSSI)
- Society for Computational Economics (SCE)
- Society for Economic Dynamics (SED)
- Society of Government Economists (SGE)
- Society of Policy Modeling (SPM)
- Transportation and Public Utilities Group (TPUG)
- Union for Radical Political Economists (URPE)
