= Foundation for European Economic Development =

Charity

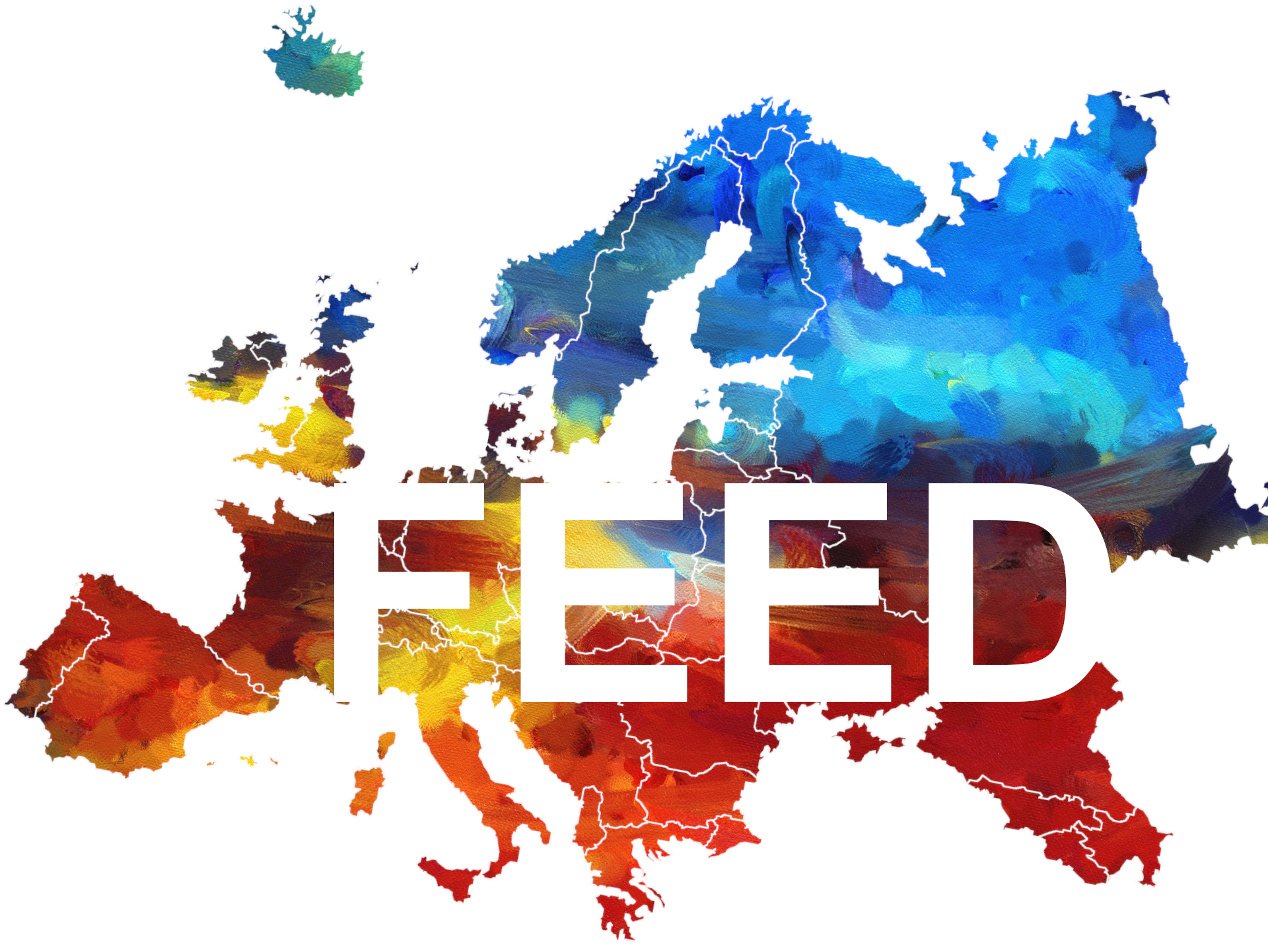
- Founded: 1990
- Location: Leeds, England
- Key people: Charles Dannreuther (Chairman); Oliver Kessler (Secretary); Andrea Bernardi (Treasurer)
- Website: charity-feed.org

Foundation for European Economic Development (FEED) is a charity formed in November 1990 under the auspices of the European Association for Evolutionary Political Economy. The charity is formally registered under the Charities Act 2006. It has provided financial assistance for various projects and organisations, including research prize competitions, summer schools, conferences, and other research events.

== Perspectives ==
According to the FEED website:

FEED believes that economists should not only have a knowledge of the history of their subject and allied work in the social sciences, but also they should have a much richer understanding of economic and business history. Economists should be trained to think critically about their assumptions and methods, and to judge theories not simply on their mathematical originality or elegance. FEED believes in the value of pluralism and diversity in any science, where radically innovative ideas are encouraged, but they are tested by rigorous scrutiny and debate. Accordingly, FEED favours a greater pluralism of theoretical approaches within economics. The discipline should not be defined in terms of a set of favoured assumptions or techniques, but in terms of the use of rigorous scientific approaches to understand and explain economic phenomena.

== Initiatives ==
In 1992, FEED funded an initiative in the form of a "plea" that was drafted and circulated among prominent members of the economics profession by Geoffrey Hodgson, Uskali Mäki, and Deirdre McCloskey. It was signed by 44 leading economists – including five Nobel Laureates – and published as an advertisement (paid for by FEED) in the May 1992 edition of The American Economic Review:

We the undersigned are concerned with the threat to economic science posed by intellectual monopoly. Economists today enforce a monopoly of method or core assumptions, often defended on no better ground than it constitutes the “mainstream.” Economists will advocate free competition, but will not practice it in the marketplace of ideas. Consequently, we call for a new spirit of pluralism in economics, involving critical conversation and tolerant communication between different approaches. Such pluralism should not undermine the standards of rigor; an economics that requires itself to face all the arguments will be a more, not a less, rigorous science. We believe that the new pluralism should be reflected in the character of scientific debate, in the range of contributions in its journals, and in the training and hiring of economists.

The above text was signed by the following leading economists: Moses Abramovitz, W. Brian Arthur, Robert Axelrod, Mark Blaug, Kenneth E. Boulding, Keith Cowling, Richard M. Cyert, Richard H. Day, Paul Davidson, Phyllis Deane, Edward F. Denison, Meghnad Desai, Christopher Freeman, Bruno Frey, Eirik Furubotn, John Kenneth Galbraith, Nicholas Georgescu-Roegen, Richard M. Goodwin, Clive W. J. Granger, Jean-Michel Gradmont, Geoffrey Harcourt, Robert Heilbroner, Albert O. Hirschman, Charles P. Kindleberger, János Kornai, David Laidler, Harvey Leibenstein, Robin C. O. Matthews, Thomas Mayer, Hyman Minsky, Franco Modigliani, Richard R. Nelson, Mancur Olson, Luigi Pasinetti, Mark Perlman, Kurt Rothschild, Paul A. Samuelson, Martin Shubik, Herbert A. Simon, Aris Spanos, Jan Tinbergen, Shigeo Tsuru, Douglas Vickers, E. Roy Weintraub.

In November 2008, FEED launched a new public appeal for funds: "Revitalizing Economics After the Crash". The petition received over 2300 signatures.

TRUSTEES: Dr Andrea Bernardi* Oxford Brookes University, UK, Secretary: Dr Charlie Dannreuther* University of Leeds, UK, Chairperson; Prof Wilfred Dolfsma Wageningen University, The Netherlands; Dr Torsten Heinrich* Chemnitz University of Technology, Germany; Dr Sam Knapfo* University of Sussex; Dr Nina Kaltenbrunner* University of Leeds; Prof Oliver Kessler University of Erfurt, Germany, Treasurer Prof Maria Lissowska Warsaw School of Economics, Poland; Dr Maria Nikolaidi University of Greenwich, UK

== See also ==
- Pluralism in economics
- Heterodox economics
