= Isabella Weber =

German economist

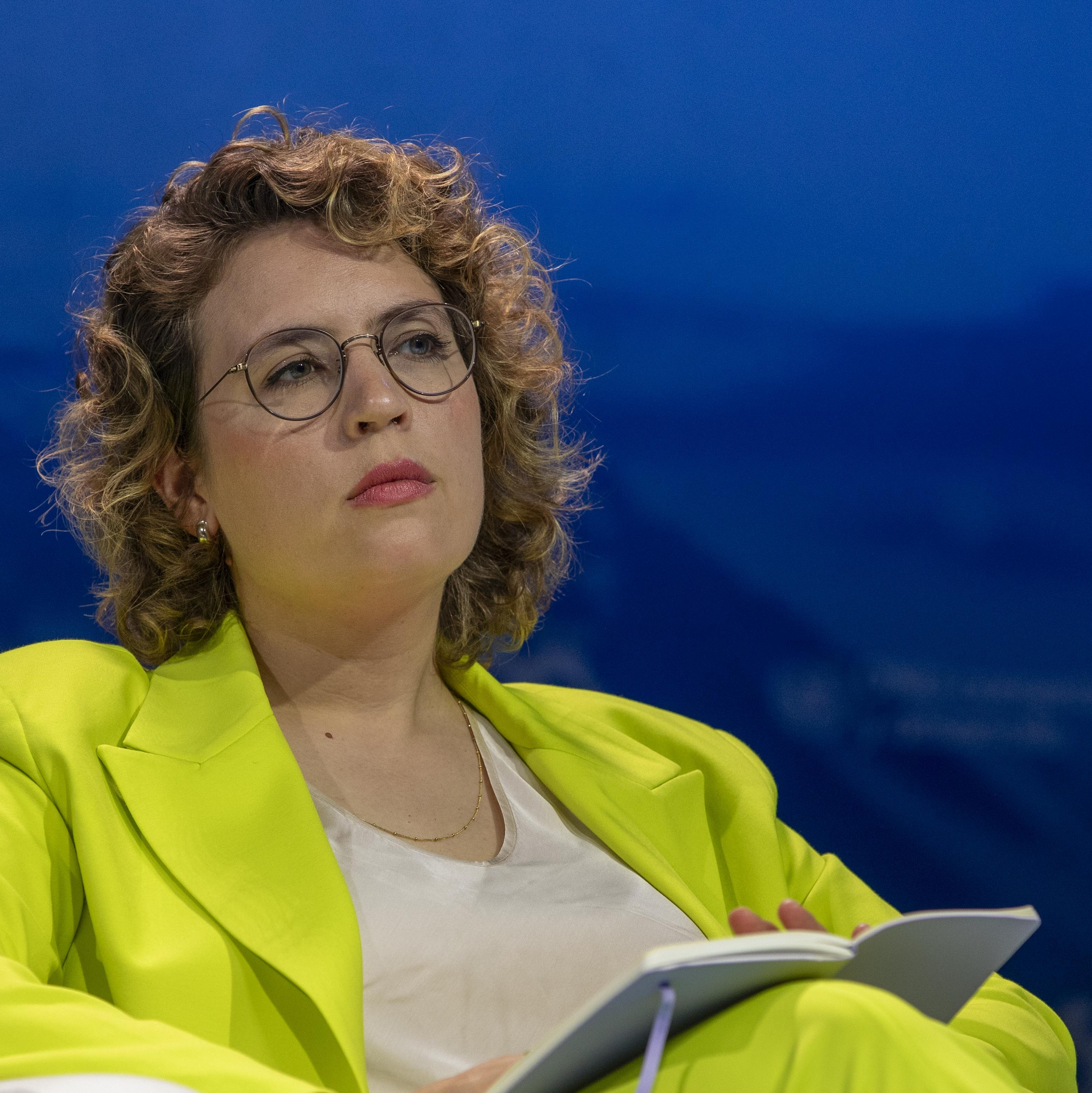
- Weber at a Global Leaders Forum in 2024
- Born: 1987 (age 38–39); Nuremberg, West Germany
- Education: Free University of Berlin (BA); University of Cambridge (PhD, 2018); The New School (PhD, 2019)
- Occupations: Economist; professor
- Known for: Sellers' inflation

Isabella M. Weber (born 1987) is a German economist. She is an associate professor of economics at the University of Massachusetts Amherst. Weber is best known for her advocacy for price controls. In additional to price caps and strict anti-price gouging legislation to combat inflation, she also supports windfall profit taxes.

== Early life and education ==
Isabella M. Weber was born in Nuremberg, West Germany, in 1987.

She completed her undergraduate studies in political science and economics at the Free University of Berlin in 2012, going on to undertake an MA in economics at The New School for Social Research in New York City, graduating in 2015.

She earned a PhD in development studies from the University of Cambridge in 2018. Her thesis was titled "China's Escape from the 'Big-Bang': The 1980s Price Reform Debate in Historical Perspective" and advised by Peter Nolan. She received a second PhD, in economics, from The New School for Social Research in 2019.

== Career ==
From 2017 to 2019, Weber was a lecturer in Economics at Goldsmiths, University of London. In 2019, she became assistant professor of economics at the University of Massachusetts Amherst, a position she continues to hold as of November 2026.

In February 2022, together with the director of the German Macroeconomic Policy Institute Sebastian Dullien, she proposed protecting consumers from high gas prices and introducing the so-called "gas price brake." Support came from the German Trade Union Confederation (DGB), among others. She became member of the German government's gas price commission, an expert advisory group of the Federal Ministry for Economic Affairs and Climate Action.

In 2022–23, Weber was a fellow in the Future of Capitalism program at the Berggruen Institute.

In 2025, the government of Chancellor Friedrich Merz appointed Weber as member of an expert commission to advise Minister of Finance Lars Klingbeil on reforming Germany's rules on public debt, co-chaired by Stephan Weil, Eckhardt Rehberg, and Stephan Müller.

=== Ideas and reception ===
In December 2021, an op-ed she published in The Guardian which argued that strategic price controls could help control inflation in bottleneck situations was criticized by many economists. Writing in The New Yorker, journalist Zachary Carter wrote in The New Yorker that this had made her into "the most hated woman in economics". Paul Krugman stated that there were "some historical examples" of price caps and they were not "wrong in principle", although he maintained that "nothing like that is going to happen in major economies in the foreseeable future".

The British magazine Prospect, in an article titled "The World’s Top Thinkers 2024", called Weber "prescient", praising her "willingness to challenge economic orthodoxies with robust, historically informed analysis". In additional to price caps and strict anti-price gouging legislation to combat inflation, she also supports windfall profit taxes.

In November 2026, in an interview on an Australian ABC Radio podcast, Weber talked about her new book, titled Anti-Fascist Economics. She argues that rising cost of living, growing inequality, and corporate profiteering leave ordinary people leaving angry and frustrated, creating fertile ground for fascist ideologies to take hold. She says that structural change by governments is needed: "Anti-fascist economics is about creating an economic policy playbook that addresses the essentials, makes them affordable with short-run measures, and then introduces more structuralist measures that change the ways in which we provision the essentials".

== Recognition and awards ==
- 2015: Vice Chancellor’s Award, Cambridge Trust
- 2018: Goldsmiths International Engagement Fund Award and Goldsmiths Research and Enterprise Committee Award
- 2018: Warren Samuels Prize for Interdisciplinary Research in History of Economic Thought and Methodology, awarded by the journal Research in the History of Economic Thought and Methodology
- 2021: Joan Robinson Prize from the European Association for Evolutionary Political Economy, for her book How China Escaped Shock Therapy: The Market Reform Debate
- 2022: Named one of Bloomberg's "50 people who defined global business in 2022"
- 2022: Capital (German magazine) 40 under 40
- 2022: Focus (German magazine) 100 Women of the Year
- 2023: Capital 40 under 40
- 2023: Listed on Time magazine's Time 100 Next, which recognizes rising leaders across multiple fields
- 2023: Listed in MarketWatch 50
- 2023: Co-winner, with Sebastian Dullien, Kurt Rothschild Prize from the Karl Renner Institute, for their proposal to dampen inflation with a gas price cap and cushion social consequences of the energy price shock
- 2023: Keynes Prize, for How China Escaped Shock Therapy, from the Keynes Society in Berlin
- 2024: Ellen Meiksins Wood Prize (Canada)
- 2024: Hans Matthöfer Prize
- 2023: New York Times Dealbook Groundbreaker

== Works ==
- How China Escaped Shock Therapy: The Market Reform Debate. Routledge (2021). ISBN 9781032008493
- Anti-Fascist Economics: In Defence of Affordability, Dignity and Democracy. Penguin (2026). ISBN 9780241796757

== See also ==
- 2021–2023 inflation surge
