= European Association for Evolutionary Political Economy =

Organization

- Founded: 1988
- Location: Rome, Italy
- Key people: Nathalie Lazaric (President); Pasquale Tridico (General Secretary); Oliver Kessler (Treasurer); Manuel Scholz-Wäckerle (Web & IT Officer); Marco Raberto (Scientific Development Plan Officer and Research Area Coordinator)
- Website: www.eaepe.org

The European Association for Evolutionary Political Economy (EAEPE) is a pluralist forum of social scientists that brings together institutional and evolutionary economists broadly defined. EAEPE members are scholars working on realistic approaches to economic theory and economic policy. With a membership of about 500, EAEPE is now the foremost European association for heterodox economists and the second-largest association for economists in Europe.

EAEPE has published the international journal Review of Evolutionary Political Economy (REPE) since 2020.

== History ==
EAEPE was established in London, on 29 June 1988. However, the formal founding meeting was only held in September 1989 at the association's first annual conference in Keswick, Cumbria, UK. At this occasion, the EAEPE Constitution was adopted and a steering committee was elected, changed later into the EAEPE Council. In November 1990, the association formed a charity, the Foundation for European Economic Development (FEED) under the Charities Act (England and Wales), with the objective of providing financial assistance for the EAEPE annual conferences and other EAEPE projects. In 1991, the association adopted a Scientific Development Plan in order to designate a number of priority Research Areas and to appoint Research Area Coordinators to act as network-builders. Since 1991, in collaboration with Edward Elgar Publishing, EAEPE has published a series of conference volumes and other focused volumes. In the mid-1990s, EAEPE organized several summer schools, with the financial support of FEED and the European Commission. EAEPE has resumed organizing annual summer schools since 2010. EAEPE is a founding shareholder of Millennium Economics Ltd.

== Theoretical perspectives ==
According to the EAEPE website, EAEPE members generally agree on the following.

Breaking away from the most standard forms of economic theorising based on a definition of economics in terms of a rigid method which is applied indiscriminately to a wide variety of economic, social or political phenomena, EAEPE embraces an open-ended and interdisciplinary analysis, that draws on relevant material in not only in economics but also in psychology, sociology, anthropology, politics, law and history.

In contrast to standard economic approaches focusing exclusively on equilibrium, EAEPE conceptualizes the economy as a cumulative process unfolding in historical time in which agents are faced with chronic information problems and radical uncertainty about the future. Contrary to standard models where individuals and their tastes are taken as given, where technology is viewed as exogenous, and where production is separated from exchange, EAEPE's concern is to address and encompass the interactive, social process through which tastes are formed and changed, the forces which promote technological transformation, and the interaction of these elements within the economic system as a whole.

In lieu of an orientation that takes the market as an ideal or natural order and as a mere aggregation of individual traders, EAEPE recognises that it is appropriate to regard the market itself as a social institution, necessarily supported by a network of other social institutions such as the state, and having no unqualified nor automatic priority over them. Instead of the widespread tendency to ignore ecological and environmental considerations or consequences in the development of theories and policy recommendation, EAEPE acknowledges that the socio-economic system depends upon, and is embedded in, an often fragile natural environment and a complex ecological system.

Rejecting the utilitarian outlook which separates considerations of means from those of ends, and judgments of fact from those of value, and which ignores social relations, conflicts and inequalities between the agents, EAEPE appreciates the fact that inquiry is value-driven and policy-orientated, and recognises the centrality of participatory democratic processes to the identification and evaluation of real needs.

Reflecting EAEPE's open-ended theoretical perspectives, EAEPE's current honorary presidents include major scholars such as János Kornai, Richard R. Nelson, Douglass C. North, Luigi Pasinetti, while Nicholas Georgescu-Roegen, Edith T. Penrose, Kurt Rothschild, G. L. S. Shackle and Herbert A. Simon were EAEPE's honorary presidents in the past. More generally, EAEPE recognises the relevance of writers as diverse as John Commons, Nicholas Kaldor, Michał Kalecki, William Kapp, John Maynard Keynes, Alfred Marshall, Karl Marx, François Perroux, Karl Polanyi, Joan Robinson, Joseph Schumpeter, Adam Smith, Thorstein Veblen and Max Weber to institutionalist and evolutionary thought.

== Research areas ==
EAEPE's research is organised around Research Areas (RAs) that include: Methodology of economics (A), Economic sociology (B), Institutional change (C), Innovation and technological change (D), Industrial Policy and Development (E1), Entrepreneurship and Theory of the Firm (E2), Environment-economy interactions (F), Macroeconomic regulation and Institutions (G), Effective Demand, Income Distribution and Finance (H), Comparative Political Economy (I), Monetary economics, finance and financial institutions (J), Gender economics and social identity (K), Labour economics (L), Social economics (M), Human development and institutions (N), Territory and migration (O), Economic history (P), Evolutionary economic simulations (S), History of political economy (T), Conceptions of Evolutionary Political Economy (V), Global political economy (W), Networks (X), Co-operative economy and collective ownership (Z).

== Awards ==
As of 2026 the association runs three main prizes:

- The William Kapp Prize, awarded annually for the best published journal article on a theme broadly in accord with the EAEPE theoretical perspectives, in honour of William Kapp
- The Joan Robinson Prize (formerly known as the Gunnar Myrdal Prize; in honour of first Gunnar Myrdal, then Joan Robinson) awarded biennially for the best monograph on a theme broadly in accord with the EAEPE theoretical perspectives
- The Herbert Simon Young Scholar Prize, awarded annually for the best conference paper by a young scholar

It also awards the REPE Best Paper Award, awarded annually to the best paper in the Review of Evolutionary Political Economy, jointly sponsored by EAEPE and Springer Nature. In collaboration with the Association for Evolutionary Economics (AFEE), the AFEE-EAEPE Veblen 150 Prize is awarded.

== Publications ==
- EAEPE's international journal Review of Evolutionary Political Economy (REPE) has been running since 2020. REPE publishes high-quality conceptual and review articles and cutting-edge methodological and empirical studies from evolutionary and international political economy, institutionalist, heterodox, computational and complexity economics and economic sociology.
- EAEPE has regularly published a series of conference volumes, several more focused volumes on specific topics as well as readers on institutional and evolutionary economics (see selected list below). Since 2006, EAEPE has sponsored a new 'Studies in Evolutionary Political Economy' edited volume series.
- In collaboration with the Association for Evolutionary Economics (AFEE), EAEPE has published a major 2-volume reference work on institutional and evolutionary economics (Hodgson, Samuels and Tool, eds, 1994).
- A newsletter was published between 1989 and 2005. A new series was released in July 2012.
- EAEPE sponsors a periodical, Journal of Institutional Economics (JOIE), devoted to the study of the nature, role and evolution of institutions in the economy. The first issue was published in 2005. There are currently 4 issues per volume. In 2012, JOIE received a high impact factor for a new journal.

== Selected EAEPE Volumes ==
- Amin, Ash and Michael Dietrich (eds) (1991), Towards a New Europe: Structural Change in the European Economy, Aldershot: Edward Elgar.
- Amin, Ash and Jerzy Hausner (eds) (1997), Beyond Market and Hierarchy: Interactive Governance and Social Complexity, Cheltenham: Edward Elgar.
- Blaas, Wolfgang and John Foster (eds) (1993), Mixed Economies in Europe: An Evolutionary Perspective on their Emergence, Transition and Regulation, Aldershot: Edward Elgar.
- Delorme, Robert and Kurt Dopfer (eds) (1994), The Political Economy of Diversity: Evolutionary Perspectives on Economic Order and Disorder, Aldershot: Edward Elgar.
- Dolfsma, Wilfred and Charlie Dannreuther (eds) (2003), Globalization, Social Capital and Inequality: Contested Concepts, Contested Experiences, Cheltenham: Edward Elgar.
- Dolfsma, Wilfred and Luc Soete (eds) (2006), Understanding the Dynamics of a Knowledge Economy, Cheltenham: Edward Elgar.
- Elsner, Wolfram and Hardy Hanappi (eds) (2008), Varieties of Capitalism and New Institutional Deals: Regulation, Welfare and the New Economy, Cheltenham: Edward Elgar.
- Finch, John and Magali Orillard (eds) (2005), Complexity and the Economy: Implications for Economic Policy, Cheltenham: Edward Elgar.
- Garrouste, Pierre and Stravos Ioannides (eds) (2001), Evolution and Path Dependence in Economic Ideas: Past and Present, Cheltenham: Edward Elgar.
- Groenewegen, John and Jack Vromen (eds) (1999), Institutions and the Evolution of Capitalism: Implications of Evolutionary Economics, Cheltenham: Edward Elgar.
- Groenewegen, John, Christos Pitelis and Sven-Erik Sjöstrand (eds) (1995), On Economic Institutions: Theory and Applications, Aldershot: Edward Elgar.
- Hanappi, Hardy and Wolfram Elsner (eds) (2008), Advances in Evolutionary Institutional Economics: Evolutionary Mechanisms, Non-Knowledge and Strategy. Cheltenham: Edward Elgar.
- Hodgson, Geoffrey M. (ed.) (2007), The Evolution of Economic Institutions: A Critical Reader, Cheltenham: Edward Elgar.
- Hodgson, Geoffrey M. and Ernesto Screpanti (eds) (1991), Rethinking Economics: Markets, Technology and Economic Evolution, Aldershot: Edward Elgar.
- Hodgson, Geoffrey M., Warren J. Samuels and Mark J. Tool (eds) (1994), The Elgar Companion to Institutional and Evolutionary Economics, 2 vols., Aldershot: Edward Elgar.
- Kunneke, Rold W., John Groenewegen and Jean-Francois Auger (eds) (2009), The Governance of Network Industries: Institutions, Technology and Policy in Reregulated Infrastructures, Cheltenham: Edward Elgar.
- Louçã, Francisco and Mark Perlman (eds) (2000). Is Economics an Evolutionary Science? The Legacy of Thorstein Veblen, Cheltenham: Edward Elgar.
- Michie, Jonathan and Angelo Reati (eds) (1998), Employment, Technology and Economic Needs: Theory, Evidence and Economic Policy, Cheltenham: Edward Elgar.
- Nielsen, Klaus and Björn Johnson (eds) (1998), Institutions and Economic Change: New Perspectives on Markets, Firms and Technology, Cheltenham: Edward Elgar.
- Salanti, Andrea and Ernesto Screpanti (eds) (1997), Pluralism in Economics: New Perspectives in History and Methodology, Cheltenham: Edward Elgar.
- Saviotti, Pier Paolo and Bart Nooteboom (eds) (2000), Technology and Knowledge: From the Firm to Innovation Systems, Cheltenham: Edward Elgar.
- Tylecote, Andrew and Jan van der Straaten (eds) (1998), Environment, Technology and Economic Growth: The Challenge of Sustainable Development, Cheltenham: Edward Elgar.

== See also ==
- Institutional economics
- Evolutionary economics
- Heterodox economics
- Pluralism in economics
- Post-autistic economics
- Human behaviour
- Institution
- Social order
- Structure and agency
- Sociocultural evolution
- Evolutionary psychology
- Universal Darwinism
- Realism
- Social innovation
- Public policy
- Innovation
- ESDP Network
- Institute for New Economic Thinking
- Geoffrey Hodgson
