= Review of Radical Political Economics =

- Discipline: Economics
- Language: English
- Edited by: Enid Arvidson

Publication details
- History: 1969-present
- Publisher: SAGE Publishing on behalf of the Union for Radical Political Economics
- Frequency: Quarterly
- Impact factor: 0.579 (2017)

Standard abbreviations
- ISO 4: Rev. Radic. Political Econ.

Indexing
- ISSN: 0486-6134 (print); 1552-8502 (web)
- LCCN: 78008755
- OCLC no.: 474576131

Links
- Journal homepage; Online access; Online archive

The Review of Radical Political Economics is a quarterly peer-reviewed academic journal published by SAGE Publishing on behalf of the Union for Radical Political Economics. It was established in 1968 and covers research on heterodox economics and political economy, broadly defined. The editor is Enid Arvidson (University of Texas at Arlington).

== Abstracting and indexing ==
The journal is abstracted and indexed in the Social Sciences Citation Index. According to the Journal Citation Reports, the journal has a 2017 impact factor of 0.579, ranking it 281st out of 353 journals in the category "Economics".

== See also ==
- Radical political economics
- Real-World Economics Review
