= Frederic Sterling Lee =

American economist (1949–2014)

- Born: November 24, 1949; Nyack, New York, US
- Died: October 23, 2014 (aged 64); Webster Groves, Missouri, US

Academic background
- Education: Rutgers University
- Doctoral advisor: Alfred S. Eichner
- Influences: Karl Marx, J.M. Keynes, Gardiner C. Means, Alfred S. Eichner

Academic work
- School or tradition: Post Keynesian economics; Heterodox Economics
- Institutions: UC Riverside (1981–1984); Roosevelt University (1984–1991); De Montfort University (1991–2000); University of Missouri-Kansas City (2000–2014)
- Notable ideas: Heterodox Microeconomic Theory, History of Heterodox Economics
- Awards: Helen Potter Award (1988), Gunnar Myrdal Prize (2000), Ludwig Mai Service Award (2009)
- Website: sites.google.com/view/leefs/

Frederic Sterling Lee (November 24, 1949 – October 23, 2014) was an American heterodox economist. His primary theoretical contribution to heterodox economics lies in the areas of pricing, price, production, costs, market competition, market governance, and the modeling of the economy as a disaggregated, emergent whole. He was the founding editor of the Heterodox Economics Newsletter (2004–2009), the editor of the American Journal of Economics and Sociology (2009–2013), the president of the Association for Institutional Thought (2012), the president of the Association for Evolutionary Economics (2015), and the founder and honorary life president of the Association for Heterodox Economics. Lee authored and edited several books, including Post Keynesian Price Theory (1998), A History of Heterodox Economics (2009), and Microeconomic Theory: A Heterodox Approach (2017). He published numerous articles and book chapters, book entries, book reviews, and various notes.

== Biography ==
Lee was born in 1949 in Nyack, New York, and grew up in Virginia. His father, Sterling Lee, was a labor lawyer and his mother, Marian Burks Lee, was a politically active person. With this family background, he was aware of progressive politics and civil and workers rights even in his early days. He went to Frostburg State College (Maryland, 1968–1972) and obtained a BA degree in history. While doing his undergraduate study, he was interested in philosophy and later in economics because he found that social questions in the 19th century were mainly examined by economists. After two years of working in Saudi Arabia (a supply clerk position with the Corps of Engineers in Riyadh), he returned to the United States and continued his study at Columbia University in New York City. In 1977 Fred Lee met Alfred S. Eichner who later became his “mentor, dissertation advisor, and friend.” He once noted that the “discovery of Eichner” was “the most important in my academic career.” With Eichner's encouragement and support, Fred Lee started his PhD study in economics at Rutgers University in 1978, where he was taught by Alfred Eichner, Paul Davidson, Jan Kregel, Nina Shapiro, and Alessandro Roncaglia, among others. After graduating from Rutgers University in 1983, he taught at University of California—Riverside (1981–1984), Roosevelt University (Chicago, 1984–1990), Staffordshire Polytechnic (Stoke-on-Trent, UK, 1990–1991), De Montfort University (Leicester, UK, 1991–2000), and the University of Missouri—Kansas City (2000–2014).

== Selected publications ==
=== Books ===
- Microeconomic Theory: A Heterodox Approach, authored by Frederic S. Lee, edited by Tae-Hee Jo, London: Routledge. 2018
- Handbook of Research Methods and Applications in Heterodox Economics, edited with Bruce Cronin, Edward Elgar. 2016.
- Marx, Veblen, and the Foundations of Heterodox Economics: Essays in Honor of John F. Henry, edited with Tae-Hee Jo, London: Routledge. 2015
- Social Costs of Markets and Economic Theory (edited), Wiley-Blackwell, 2014.
- Markets, Competition, and the Economy as a Social System (edited), Wiley-Blackwell, 2013
- In Defense of Post-Keynesian and Heterodox Economics: Responses to their critics (edited with Marc Lavoie), Routledge, 2012.
- Social Provisioning, Embeddedness and Modeling the Economy (edited), Wiley-Blackwell, 2011.
- Social, Methods, and Microeconomics: Contributions to doing economics better (edited), Wiley-Blackwell, 2011.
- Evaluating Economic Research in a Contested Discipline: Ranking, pluralism, and the future of heterodox economics (edited with W. Elsner), Wiley-Blackwell, 2010.
- A History of Heterodox Economics: Challenging the mainstream in the twentieth century, Routledge, 2009.
- Radical Economics and Labor: Essays Inspired by the IWW Centennial (edited with Jon Bekken), Routledge, 2009.
- Post Keynesian Price Theory, Cambridge University Press, 1998. Reprinted in paperback, November, 2006.
- A Monetary Theory of Employment by Gardiner C. Means (edited with Warren Samuels), M. E. Sharpe, 1994.
- Oxford Economics and Oxford Economists 1922–1971: Recollections of Students and Economists (edited), Bodleian Library, Oxford, 1993, (MS. Eng. c. 4819).
- The Economics of P. W. S. Andrews: A Collection (edited with Peter E. Earl), Edward Elgar, 1993.
- Oxford Economics and Oxford Economists (co‑authored with Warren Young), Macmillan, 1993.
- The Heterodox Economics of Gardiner C. Means: A Collection (edited with Warren J. Samuels), M. E. Sharpe, 1992.
