= Post-autistic economics =

Political movement criticizing neoclassical economics

The post-autistic economics movement (French: autisme-économie), or movement of students for the reform of economics teaching (French: mouvement des étudiants pour une réforme de l'enseignement de l'économie), is a political movement that criticises neoclassical economics and advocates for pluralism in economics. The movement gained attention after an open letter signed by almost a thousand economics students at French universities and grandes ecoles was published in Le Monde in 2000.

== Terminology ==
The French term autisme has an older meaning than the English term autism and signifies "abnormal subjectivity, acceptance of fantasy rather than reality". However, Steve Keen also asserts that "neoclassical economics has the characteristics of an autistic child".

The pejorative reference to autism is considered offensive by some economists.

== Response ==
The French minister of education appointed a panel headed by Jean-Paul Fitoussi to inquire into economics teaching. In 2000, the panel called for limited reform.

Articles associated with the movement were published in the Post-Autistic Economics Newsletter from September 2000. This electronic newsletter became the Post-Autistic Economics Review and, since 2008, has existed as the peer-reviewed journal Real-World Economics Review.

Several responses to the French students' open letter were also published in Le Monde. A counter-petition signed by 15 French economists was published in October 2000. Robert Solow adhered to the "main thesis" of the French students' petition, but criticised the "opaque and almost incomprehensible" debate that followed among academics. Olivier Blanchard published a response defending mainstream economics. Other notable economists, such as Steve Keen and James K. Galbraith, wrote elsewhere in support of the French students.

== See also ==
- Heterodox economics
- History of economic thought
- Humanistic economics
- Pluralism in economics
- Post-Keynesian economics
- Real-world economics
