= Technology Choice in Developing Countries =

1983 book by Michel A. Amsalem

Technology Choice in Developing Countries: The Textile and Pulp and Paper Industries is a 1983 book by Michel A. Amsalem. It was published by MIT Press. The book examines the choice of industrial technology in developing countries.

== Publication ==
MIT Press published the hardcover edition in 1983. A paperback edition was published in 2003.

== Reception ==
Thomas R. De Gregori reviewed the book in the Journal of Economic Issues in 1984. Gregori wrote in the review that the book addressed weaknesses in earlier research on technology choice. Frank Davidson reviewed the book in Études internationales in 1984. He focused on Amsalem's research method. Davidson noted that the book looked at individual stages of production rather than treating a factory as a single unit. It also examined the technologies that were actually available to firms. The study considered more than capital and labour. It also looked at skills, materials, energy and other production needs. Hal Hill reviewed the book in Contemporary Southeast Asia in 1987. Hill also pointed to a less favourable finding. Many firms in developing countries used more labour than comparable firms in the United States. Hill suggested several reasons. These included price distortions, limited information, risk and weak competition. The book was discussed by Martin Bell and Keith Pavitt in a 1993 article in Industrial and Corporate Change. They noted that the study showed how firms chose and adapted equipment. It focused on new textile and paper plants in developing countries.
