= Real-world economics =

Heterodox economic field

Real-world economics is a school of economics that uses an inductive method to understand economic processes. It approaches economics without making a priori assumptions about how ideal markets work, in contrast to what Nobel Prize-winning economist, Ronald Coase, referred to as "blackboard economics" and its deductive method.

== See also ==
- Post-autistic economics
- Heterodox economics
- Complexity economics
- Pluralism in economics
- Humanistic economics
- Real-World Economics Review
- Historical school of economics
- Foundations of Real-World Economics
