= Windfall tax =

Higher tax rate on companies

A windfall tax is a higher tax rate on profits that ensue from a sudden windfall gain to a particular company or industry.

There have been windfall taxes in various countries across the world, including Australia, Italy, (Note: Italy's windfall tax was unexpected and had a 40% rate on the profits accruing to Italian banks due to higher interest rates. By the next day, Italian bank shares dived, which caused a loss of €10 billion in value, and the Meloni government modified the measure and capped the tax at 0.1% of a lender's total assets.) and Mongolia (2006–2009). During the 2021–2023 global energy crisis, policy specialists at the International Monetary Fund recommended that governments institute permanent windfall profits taxes targeted at economic rents in the energy sector, excluding renewable energy to prevent hindering its further development.

== Discussion ==
=== Support ===
Thomas Baunsgaard and Nate Verson of the IMF recommend implementing permanent windfall profit taxes on fossil fuel extraction but not temporary taxes or taxes on renewable energy. The taxes should always target a clear measure of excess profits and not be tied to price levels or revenue. They also recommend ensuring that markets can add new capacity quickly if-needed to avoid a spike in prices. Another 2022 IMF paper argues these taxes are a tool for efficiently taxing economic rents, which are often a result of monopolistic power or unexpected events like pandemics, war, or natural disasters, and contribute to windfall profits. Such profits have raised public and policy concerns about price gouging, where firms are perceived to be profiting excessively from unforeseen circumstances.

Eric Levitz argues that these taxes are worth pursuing as it would incentivize producers to invest in lowering prices during times of supply shocks by expanding production instead of giving out dividends to shareholders.

In 2022, Joseph Stiglitz argued for windfall profit taxes for oil and gas in Australia to disincentivize raising prices.

In 2022, an informal survey of 33 American and European economists at the IGM forum found majority support for taxing windfall profits.

In 2023, a group co-directed by Thomas Piketty suggested taxing windfalls from excess profits.

As of 2023, Isabella Weber has also been advocating for windfall profit taxes.

=== Criticism ===
A 2008 Wall Street Journal editorial argued that income taxes incentivize companies to make more profits which results in more tax revenue. A 2022 Reason article argued against windfall taxes.

== Australia ==
Queensland, Australia has a windfall profits tax on energy sources like coal.

Polling by the Australia Institute as well as Oxfam showed more than two-thirds of Australians supported windfall profit taxes.

== European Union ==
For fiscal years 2022 and 2023, The EU asked energy companies to return 33% of taxable surplus profits to governments to help fund energy affordability and address shortages.

=== On solar power ===
Rapid drop of photovoltaic equipment in the period 2011 to 2013 has created windfall profits conditions due to lagging response of regulators by adjustment of feed-in tariffs. Regulators in Spain, Greece, Bulgaria and Romania have introduced retroactive incentive reductions. In the Czech Republic a windfall tax has been introduced on solar electricity and further clampdown of solar power companies was considered in 2014.

=== Greece ===
In November 2022, Greece responded to soaring energy prices by imposing a 90% excess profits tax on energy companies. The Greek energy minister justified this decision by stating, "Our primary concern is to maintain affordable prices on consumer bills until the end of this major, pan-European energy crisis." The tax revenues were used to subsidize energy prices.

=== Netherlands ===
In November 2022, the Dutch government introduced a temporary windfall tax as a strategic response to mitigate the impact of surging energy prices. This 33% tax targets companies operating within the oil, natural gas, coal, and petroleum refining industries. The tax applies to profits that exceed the average profit margins of these sectors by more than 20% during the reference period from 2018 to 2021, as specified by the ministry. This measure is intended to buffer the financial shock experienced by consumers and stabilize market fluctuations in the energy sector.

=== Scandinavia ===
Finland announced its intention to tax windfall profits at large nuclear and hydro plants built before 1997 by 2010 or 2011. As non-CO2 emitting electricity generators, these plants have all seen their profits increase because of the European Union Emissions Trading System.

As of 2009, in Sweden, hydroelectricity is subject to a property tax and nuclear power plants to a capacity-based tax. While neither are windfall taxes, they were raised in 2008 due to higher windfall profits. In 2009, Norway, where hydro-electric power plants supply 99% of the country's electricity, similarly imposed a ground rent tax on hydro-electric power plants to reduce their profits by 30%.

== Mongolia ==
Mongolia implemented in 2006 taxation on the profits made by mining companies operating in Mongolia. A tax on unsmelted copper and gold concentrate produced in Mongolia, it was the highest windfall tax in the world. The tax was repealed in 2009 and phased out over two years. Repealing the 68% tax law was considered essential to enable foreign mining companies to invest in mineral resources development of Mongolia.

== United Kingdom ==
In the United Kingdom, an early one-off windfall tax was levied on certain bank deposits as part of the 1981 budget under Margaret Thatcher. In 1997, the government of Tony Blair introduced a Windfall Tax for privatised utility companies. In May 2022, Boris Johnson introduced the tax for energy companies extracting oil and gas in the UK, to help fund a package to relieve the UK cost of living crisis.

== United States ==
=== 1980 excise tax ===
The Crude Oil Windfall Profit Tax Act of 1980 (P.L. 96-223) was part of a compromise between the Carter Administration and the Congress over the decontrol of crude oil prices. The Act was intended to recoup the revenue earned by oil producers as a result of the sharp increase in oil prices brought about by the OPEC oil embargo. According to a report by the Congressional Research Service, the Act's title was a misnomer as it was just an excise tax imposed on the difference between the market price of oil and a 1979 base price adjusted for inflation and severance taxes. The report also stated that the tax only generated $40 billion in net revenue though it was projected to generate $175 billion, and because the tax was an excise tax on oil produced domestically in the United States and not imposed on imported oil, it reduced domestic oil production by 1–5% while dependence on imported oil increased by 3–13%.

== See also ==
- Excess profits tax
- Inheritance tax
- Land value tax
