= Rethinking Economics =

Network promoting pluralism in economics

Rethinking Economics is a network of academic scholars and students in several countries that promotes pluralism in economics. It grew out of the broader International Student Initiative for Pluralist Economics and has groups in the United Kingdom, Italy, the Netherlands, India, Bangladesh, the US, Norway and many more countries. The goal of the movement is to open up the discipline to different schools of thought in economics other than neoclassical economics and to other disciplines in the social sciences. Another aim is to make economics more accessible to the broader public.

== Background ==
In 2011, the Bank of England organized a conference ‘Are Economics Graduates Fit for Purpose?’ which although widely discussed did not lead to substantive changes in the way economics is taught in many universities. Subsequently, a group of Manchester economics students who were dissatisfied with the inertia of the economics discipline after the Great Recession founded the Post-Crash Economics Society.

== Goals ==
The group campaigns for multiple changes in the research and teaching of economics, as well as for a different connection between economics and the public. Specifically, Rethinking Economics demands more real-world applicability of the contents in economics degrees. Moreover, they want to show that economic approaches are contested instead of being akin to physics-like laws, which makes it necessary to introduce students to a variety of approaches in orthodox and heterodox economics as well as equipping them with tools to critically evaluate these approaches. The campaign's goal is therefore not to displace Neoclassical economics but instead to let other approaches join the ranks in economics curricula and research. Another aim of the group is to make economic knowledge more widely available and breaking economists' monopoly of such knowledge.

== Activities ==
The networks in the various countries are actively campaigning for changes in the curriculum of economics degrees. This includes lobbying with economics departments at universities, organizing public events and providing material to students and teachers in economics. The British Rethinking Economics group has to date published two books on the subject. In The Econocracy, a team of students links the dominance of neoclassical economics to an erosion of a wider democratic discussion about how the economy should be seen and organized. A second book called Rethinking Economics: An Introduction to Pluralist Economics provides an overview of different schools of thought in economics that are rarely included in introductory textbooks of economics. It includes chapters on several heterodox schools of thought written by leading academics in the field.

The Dutch branch of the organization has conducted an extensive curriculum review of undergraduate economics degrees in the Netherlands. Courses were evaluated according to different criteria such as how many different methods and schools of thought are taught, how much critical thinking is fostered and the real-world relevance of the courses.

Both the Bank of England and the Institute for New Economic Thinking have collaborated with the movement in the past.

Rethinking Economics for Africa (REFA), which emerged from the University of the Witwatersrand in Johannesburg and has since expanded across South Africa, hosts an annual Rethinking Economics for Africa Festival, sponsoring students from across the continent to attend and featuring discussions and debates by prominent economists including Thandika Mkandawire, Jayati Ghosh, James Galbraith, and others. The festival is free for students, academics, and members of the public.

Rethinking Economics Norway was founded in 2016, and has chapters at all the large universities. In 2021 the organization published the book Økonomisk tenkning [Economic thought] presenting different economic schools of thoughts.

== Reception ==
The movement has received coverage by newspapers such as the Financial Times and endorsements by various public figures. Cambridge economist Ha-Joon Chang praised their newest book as a 'highly relevant and enlightening contribution to a debate that will shape the future of the world economy as well as the way in which economics is taught and debated'. Chief economics commentator of the Financial Times Martin Wolf wrote the foreword to the book and welcomed the initiative.
