= Steve Keen =

Australian economist and author (born 1953)

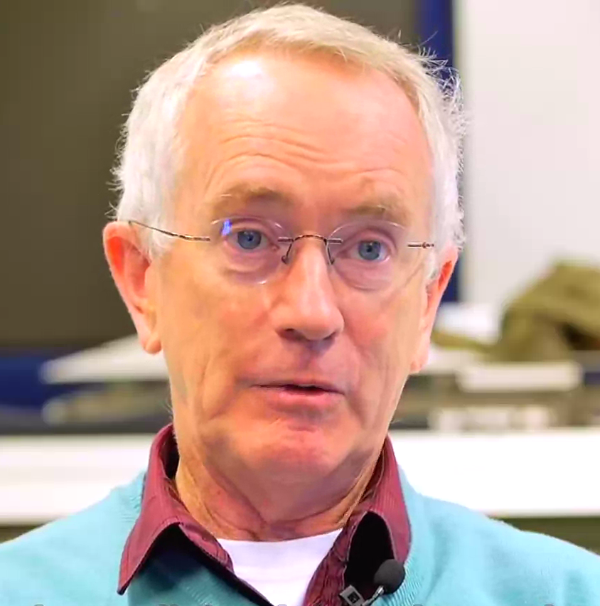
- Keen in 2013
- Born: 28 March 1953 (age 73); Sydney, New South Wales, Australia

Academic background
- Education: University of Sydney (BA, LLB); University of New South Wales (MComm, PhD)
- Influences: Keynes; Minsky; Fisher; Marx; Moore; Sraffa; Graziani; Veblen; Schumpeter; Quesnay; R. M. Goodwin; Georgescu-Roegen

Academic work
- School or tradition: Post-Keynesian economics, Ecological economics
- Notable ideas: Mathematical models of financial crises and debt-deflation
- Website: Information at IDEAS / RePEc

Steve Keen (born 28 March 1953) is an Australian economist and author. He considers himself a post-Keynesian and a critic of neoclassical economics.

Keen was formerly an associate professor of economics at University of Western Sydney, until he applied for voluntary redundancy in 2013, due to the closure of the economics program at the university. In 2014, he became a professor and Head of the School of Economics, History and Politics at Kingston University in London. He has since taken retirement and is crowd source funded to undertake independent research; he is an Honorary Professor UCL, and Distinguished Research Fellow at the Institute for Strategy Resilience & Security, University College London.

== Early life ==
Keen was born in Sydney in 1953. His father was a bank manager. Keen graduated with a Bachelor of Arts in 1974 and a Bachelor of Laws in 1976, both from the University of Sydney. He then completed a Diploma of Education at the Sydney Teachers College in 1977.

In 1990, he completed a Master of Commerce in economics and economic history at the University of New South Wales. He completed his PhD in economics at the University of New South Wales in 1997.

== Economics ==
=== Financial instability and debt deflation ===
Most of Steve Keen's recent work focuses on modeling Hyman Minsky's financial instability hypothesis and Irving Fisher's debt deflation. The hypothesis predicts that an overly large private debt to GDP ratio can cause deflation and depression. Here, the falling of the price level results in a continually rising real quantity of outstanding debt. Moreover, the continued deleveraging of outstanding debts increases the rate of deflation. Thus, debt and deflation act on and react to one another, resulting in a debt-deflation spiral. The outcome is a depression.

=== Debunking Economics ===
Keen's critique of neoclassical economics is contained in his 2001 book Debunking Economics. He argues that neoclassical assumptions are fundamentally flawed or empirically unsupported; and that economists' overall conclusions are very sensitive to small changes in these assumptions.

Keen has attempted to counter Karl Marx's theory (in his view Marx's pre-1857 view, specifically) from a post-Keynesian perspective, by arguing machines can add more product-value over their operational lifetime than the total value of depreciation charged "during those asset lives".

Keen's book closes with a survey of various schools of heterodox economics, concluding "None of these is at present strong enough or complete enough to declare itself a contender for the title of 'the' economic theory of the 21st century."

=== Critique of neoclassical theory of the firm ===
Keen has challenged the theories of perfect competition and monopoly, and in particular the argument that firms in "perfect competition" and monopolies are usefully thought of as representing polar opposites. Keen has referred to this as "the theory of the firm." He argues that they are contradictory and incoherent taken as a whole; and that the number of firms in a market is practically irrelevant to whether the firm's output choice affects the overall market price in the simplified (and practically unlikely) case of uniform firm cost structures and a downward-sloping market demand curve. He goes on to explore various scenarios by which many firms might arrive at an "equilibrium" market price and level of output. Keen further notes that cost structures are rarely uniform and that in the presence of significant economies from scale of production, a so-called "monopoly" realizing such economies of scale would be led to higher output and lower price than a large number of competing firms unable to realise such economies of scale. Keen also takes note of empirical evidence that many actual business firms produce a range of output whose marginal cost may be less than average cost and falling, and firms openly desire to produce and sell more at current prices.

Keen's article on "profit maximisation, industry structure, and competition" has elicited counter-arguments by Paul Anglin. Chris Auld has additionally claimed to show that Keen & Standish's arguments are inconsistent with standard assumptions used in perfect competition, and their analysis uses calculus improperly.

=== Climate change ===
Keen criticises the economics of climate change generally and the 2018 work by Nordhaus in particular: "economists made their own predictions of damages, using three spurious methods: assuming that about 90% of GDP will be unaffected by climate change, because it happens indoors; using the relationship between temperature and GDP today as a proxy for the impact of global warming over time; and using surveys that diluted extreme warnings from scientists with optimistic expectations from economists." For example, indoor activities can be disrupted by extreme weather (e.g. Hurricane Sandy). Keen also argues that regressions of the GSP of states in the US to average temperature are flawed as the states have similar per capita income, that other factors are more important to GSP rather than average temperature, and that assuming the weak correlation found would continue to hold true with further global warming is begging the question.

When specifically speaking about Nordhaus, he says that "Nordhaus has misrepresented the scientific literature to justify the using a smooth function to describe the damage to GDP from climate change. Correcting for these errors makes it feasible that the economic damages from climate change are at least an order of magnitude worse than forecast by economists, and may be so great as to threaten the survival of human civilization."

=== Politics ===
In August 2015, Keen endorsed Jeremy Corbyn's campaign in the Labour Party leadership election. Keen ran as a senate candidate for The New Liberals in New South Wales during the 2022 Australian federal election.

==== Views on the UK's EU referendum ====
Keen was in favour of the UK leaving the European Union, stating mainstream economists were over-certain and exaggerating the likely effects following the country's withdrawal. Keen regards the open-borders free-movement policy of the EU as precipitate and unsustainable in the absence of a common fiscal policy; all the more so, given how migrants impose burdens on public services in destination countries also experiencing austerity.

He also states the Euro is destined to fail, not least because of the way it penalises recession-hit countries unable to pursue expansive fiscal policy, and indeed considers the whole EU project as a failed one destined for collapse.

== Software Projects ==
=== Minsky ===
Keen commissioned the development of a software package called Minsky for visually modelling national economies, in a way that is intended to be more accurate than mainstream macroeconomic models – which he contends do not properly include debt and banking. He envisages it being used for both educational and research purposes.

The first phase of the development was funded by an academic research grant, as is typical for academic research projects – but in February 2013 Keen launched a crowdfunding project on Kickstarter to allow members of the public to contribute towards taking MINSKY to the next level of development. In the first 24 hours, this project raised approximately 15% of its funding target, and has since fully achieved its initial funding goal of $50,000.00.

=== Ravel ===
Keen introduced Ravel in 2021. He developed it with Russell Standish as a new way to analyze and display data. The software uses Minsky's user interface.

== Criticism ==
Economist Chris Auld argues that Keen's criticism of the basic model of perfect competition makes basic mathematical errors.

Matthijs Krul maintains that Keen, while broadly accurate in his criticism of the neoclassical synthesis, generally misrepresents Marx's views in Debunking Economics and in earlier work when asserting that, in the production of commodities, machinery produces more value than it costs.

Austrian School economists Robert P. Murphy and Gene Callahan claim Keen's 2001 book "suffers from many of the very faults of which he accuses the mainstream". They also claim that much of his work is "ideologically motivated even while criticising neoclassical economics for being ideological". They praise his critique of perfect competition and his chapter on dynamic vs. static models, whilst they criticise his attempts at objective value theory and what they claim is his misrepresentation of the Austrian School interpretation of Say's law.

== Other publications ==
- Keen, Steve (2021). The New Economics. A manifesto. Polity. ISBN 9781509545292.
- Keen, Steve (2017). Can We Avoid Another Financial Crisis? Polity. ISBN 9781509513734.
- Keen, Steve (2015). Developing an economics for the post-crisis world. World Economics Association and College Publications. ISBN 9781848901865.
- Lee, Frederic S. and Steve Keen (2004): "The Incoherent Emperor: A Heterodox Critique of Neoclassical Microeconomic Theory", Review of Social Economy, V. 62, Iss. 2: 169–199
- Co-editor of: Commerce, Complexity and Evolution: Topics in Economics, Finance, Marketing, and Management: Proceedings of the Twelfth International Symposium in Economic Theory and Econometrics. New York: Cambridge University Press. ISBN 0-521-62030-9.
- The Debunking Economics Podcast: with Phil Dobbie and Prof. Steve Keen (http://debunkingeconomics.com)

== See also ==
- Paul Ormerod
- Hyman Minsky
- Critique of political economy
