= Windfall tax (Mongolia) =

Tax in Mongolia

The Windfall tax or windfall profits tax (Mongolian: Гэнэтийн ашгийн татвар) in Mongolia was a taxation on the profits made by mining companies operating in Mongolia. It was implemented in 2006 and was the highest windfall profits tax in the world. It was a tax on unsmelted copper and gold concentrate that was produced in Mongolia. The tax was repealed in 2009 and phased out over two years. Repealing the 68% tax law was considered essential to enabling foreign mining companies to invest in Mongolia's mineral resource development.

== Implementation ==
The tax was initially proposed to the State Great Khural (the Mongolian Parliament) in 2005, initially taxing copper and gold profits when their respective prices reach $2,600 per tonne and $500 per troy ounce. The bill was passed in May 2006, and the law was amended in 2006, changing the gold price that would be taxed to $650 per ounce, and eventually to $850 per ounce. The tax rate was 68%, which was the highest in the world. The tax was implemented with the hopes that copper mining companies would smelt their copper within the country rather than shipping concentrate out as there would be no windfall tax if the material was smelted in Mongolia.

The implementation of the tax was not anticipated by Vancouver-based Ivanhoe Mines, owners of the Oyu Tolgoi Project in Mongolia. Following the announcement by the Government of Mongolia, shares of Ivanhoe (traded on the Toronto Stock Exchange) dropped over 21% (or CA$2.22).

== Opposition ==
Ivanhoe made the case that the addition of a smelter to the Oyu Tolgoi Project would increase the capital required to bring the project into production. Others suggested that the small-scale independent miners would simply not report their full production to the government, or turn to smuggling to avoid the tax. There was opposition to the rate being established by Mongolbank by government appointment, and a claim that it was against the Constitution of Mongolia. The Constitutional Court of Mongolia later determined that this was not a violation. In 2009, the tax was repealed with a phase-out period that lasted until 2011.

== Repeal ==
Rio Tinto and its partner Ivanhoe Mines made the scrapping of the tax a precondition to their signing an agreement to establish the Oyu Tolgoi mine, a major copper-gold mining project in the Gobi Desert. The government agreed to the removal of the tax in return for an increase in royalties from Oyu Tolgoi. The tax was repealed in early 2011, with Oyu Tolgoi commencing commercial production in 2013.
