= International Student Initiative for Pluralist Economics =

The International Student Initiative for Pluralist Economics (ISIPE) is an alliance of university student groups and societies from several countries campaigning for a reform of economics education and research. Founded in early 2014, the Initiative brings together various groups that had previously operated at a local or national level such as Rethinking Economics. It argues for a reorientation of the discipline toward pluralism in university curricula as well as research activity, involving the inclusion and equal treatment of heterodox approaches, greater interdisciplinarity, as well as increased awareness of methodological issues, the history of economic thought, and economic history.

== Background ==
In the second half of the 20th century, the discipline of economics came to be increasingly dominated by what is seen by the Initiative as a fundamentally uniform, monolithic approach (which may be referred to as mainstream, neoclassical, orthodox, or dominant paradigm economics), with alternatives becoming marginalised in education and research. The case for pluralism in economics had previously been made by similar initiatives such as the '1992 Plea' organised by FEED. The 2008 financial crisis and its aftermath appear to have provided new impetus, with various new organisations having been founded since then.

In May 2014, The Guardian reported that in nineteen countries students criticised economics courses for falling wider society.

== Manifesto ==
ISIPE released an international manifesto on 5 May 2014. The manifesto took the form of an open letter, signed by 42 student groups across 19 countries.

The release of the international manifesto was met with a large media echo in various countries. As of 29 May 2014, 2400 individuals in 99 countries, mostly from academia, have signed up in support of the plea.

Since the release of the manifesto, the initiative has grown significantly, now comprising 65 student groups from 30 countries.

== Political alignment ==
ISIPE aims to be politically neutral. Its objective is not to promote a particular point of view or methodology, but to promote the idea that having multiple points of view and multiple methodologies is a good thing. While some associated with the movement are primarily interested in certain branches of economics, the movement itself aims promote non-orthodox economic thought in general. Various groups have called for the inclusion of both Marxian and Austrian Schools of thought in the economics curriculum, representing almost polar opposites of the political spectrum.

== Membership ==
The founding organisations of ISIPE are:

- Sociedad de Economía Crítica Argentina y Uruguay; Argentina
- Gesellschaft für Plurale Ökonomik Wien; Austria
- Nova Ágora; Brazil
- Mouvement étudiant québécois pour un enseignement pluraliste de l'économie; Canada
- Estudios Nueva Economía; Chile
- Det Samfundsøkonomiske Selskab (DSS)); Denmark
- Post-Crash Economics Society Essex; England
- Cambridge Society for Economic Pluralism; England
- Better Economics UCL; England
- Post-Crash Economics Society Manchester; England
- SOAS Open Economics Forum; England
- Alternative Thinking for Economics Society, Sheffield University; England
- LSE Post-Crash Economics; England
- Pour un Enseignement Pluraliste de l'Economie dans le Supérieur (PEPS-Economie); France
- Netzwerk Plurale Ökonomik (Network for Pluralist Economics); Germany
- Oikos Köln; Germany
- Real World Economics, Mainz; Germany
- Kritische WissenschaftlerInnen Berlin; Germany
- Arbeitskreis Plurale Ökonomik, Bayreuth; Germany
- Arbeitskreis Plurale Ökonomik, München; Germany
- Oikos Leipzig; Germany
- Was ist Ökonomie, Berlin; Germany
- Impuls. für eine neue Wirtschaft, Erfurt; Germany
- Ecoation, Augsburg; Germany
- Kritische Ökonomen, Frankfurt; Germany
- Arbeitskreis Plurale Ökonomik, Hamburg; Germany
- Real World Economics, Heidelberg; Germany
- Stundent HUB Weltethos Institut Tübingen; Germany
- LIE - Lost in Economics e.V., Regensburg; Germany
- Jodhpur University Heterdox Economics Association; India
- Economics Student Forum – Haifa; Israel
- Economics Student Forum - Tel Aviv; Israel
- Rethinking Economics Italia; Italy
- Oeconomicus Economic Club MGIMO; Russia
- Glasgow University Real World Economics Society; Scotland
- Movement for Pluralistic Economics; Slovenia
- Post-Crash Barcelona; Spain
- Lunds Kritiska Ekonomer; Sweden
- Handels Students for Sustainability; Sweden
- PEPS-Helvetia; Switzerland
- Rethinking Economics UK; UK
- Rethinking Economics NL; Netherlands
- Rethinking Economics New York; United States
- Sociedad de Economía Crítica Argentina y Uruguay; Uruguay
