= World Economics Association =

Professional association

- Abbreviation: WEA
- Formation: 2011
- Legal status: Community interest company
- Purpose: Promoting diversity of approaches to economics
- Website: https://www.worldeconomicsassociation.org

The World Economics Association (WEA) is a professional association, launched in 2011, which promotes a pluralistic approach to economics.

Its key principles include worldwide membership and governance, and inclusiveness towards the variety of theoretical perspectives and applications of economics. The WEA is registered under United Kingdom law as a non-profit community interest company.

The WEA publishes three open peer reviewed open access academic journals: Economic Thought, World Social and Economic Review (formerly World Economic Review), and real-world economics review. It also publishes books, has a bimonthly newsletter, and hosts open access, online conferences.

In an article based on interviews with Fullbrook, Robert Johnson and others, Handelsblatt reported that more than 3,600 economists from 110 countries joined in the first ten days. Early supporters (and members of the Executive Committee) included Steve Keen, Dani Rodrik, James Galbraith, and Richard Koo.
