= Rania Antonopoulou =

Greek economist and politician

- Ράνια Αντωνοπούλου
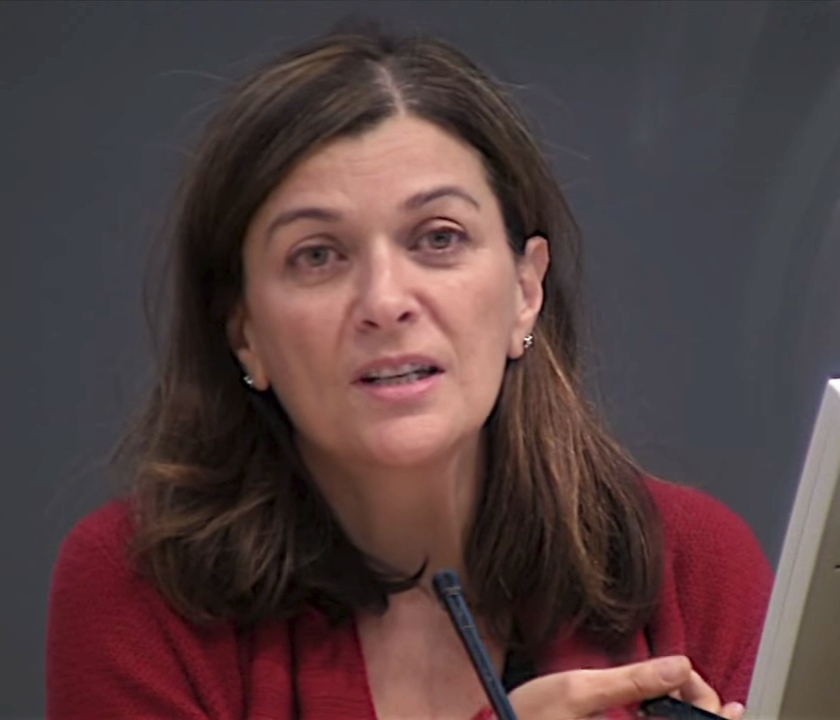
- Rania Antonopoulou at a 2013 lecture at Columbia University

Alternate Minister for Combatting Unemployment
- In office 27 January 2015 – 28 February 2018
- Prime Minister: Alexis Tsipras
- Succeeded by: Nassos Yliopoulos

Personal details
- Born: 17 December 1960 (age 65) Athens, Greece
- Party: Coalition of the Radical Left (Syriza)
- Spouse: Dimitri B. Papadimitriou
- Education: New School for Social Research
- Profession: Economist

Ourania "Rania" Antonopoulou a.k.a. Rania Antonopoulos (Greek: Ουρανία Αντωνοπούλου; born 17 December 1960) is a Greek heterodox economist and Syriza politician. After the January 2015 election, MP Alexis Tsipras named her as the Greek Alternate Minister for Combating Unemployment in his cabinet tasked to implement a job guarantee policy based on her previous work experience and a specific study for Greece with other colleagues at the Levy Economics Institute. She remains a Syriza member. On 5 September 2018 she was appointed by the Greek Government as the Permanent Representative of Greece (Ambassador) to the OECD in Paris, France, entrusting her to represent the country despite the severe media attack she had been subjected to a few months earlier. Between February and August 2015, she also was a member of the Hellenic Parliament.

A former macroeconomic policy adviser for UN Women and consultant UNDP and the ILO, she is specialized in macroeconomic gender issues and job creation in extreme unemployment economic environments. She is Associate Professor of Economics at New York Bard College and a senior scholar of the Levy Economics Institute where she is involved with the Modern Monetary Theory school of post-Keynesian economics.

A co-initiator of the Economists for Full Employment project, she has been a long-time supporter of a job guarantee with the state being employer of last resort. Following a job guarantee 2012 pilot project based in large part on her advocacy with the General Confederation of Trade Unions of Greece (ΓΣΕΕ), and subsequent empirical work she undertook at the Levy Institute for ΓΣΕΕ, she was appointed Alternate Minister for Combatting Unemployment in the Syriza-led Tsipras Government. In her ministerial office, she was specifically tasked with implementing a nationwide job guarantee program to combat long-term unemployment by creating at least 300,000 new jobs for the unemployed.

== Education and early career ==
When in 1997 Antonopoulou received her Ph.D. economics from the New School for Social Research, she had already been teaching economics at New York University and in the same year was awarded the university's Teaching Excellence Award. At New York University she taught Economics, a post she would hold until 2006.

Working in the fields of feminist economics, international trade, and the economics of globalization, Antonopoulou served as macroeconomic policy adviser for UN Women, and as advising consultant for the United Nations Development Programme (UNDP) and the International Labour Office (ILO). In 2002, she became co-director of the Knowledge Networking Program on Engendering Macroeconomics and International Economics (GEM-IWG) and co-founded GEM-Europe and GEM-Turkey.

== Academic career ==
Prior to her involvement in politics, Antonopoulou served as Associate Professor of Economics at Bard College she has been affiliated with since 2001. She is also a senior scholar with the associated Levy Economics Institute and director of the Gender Equality and the Economy program. In the last years she has further specialized in linkages of gender and macro economics, in the macroeconomic impact of job guarantee policies, and in the implications of unpaid work on poverty indicators.

In line with her heterodox policy oriented research, she continued working on her concept of a "Job guarantee" which she has been developing at the Levy Institute of Bard College since 2006. This concept turns the state into an Employer of last resort that issues publicly funded jobs at minimum wage level to everybody unable to find a job in the private sector. When job opportunities are scarce, it is argued, public policy must ensure that the institutional means of implementation of the RIGHT TO WORK, that is, of Article 23.1 of the Universal Declaration of Human Rights are in place. The huge rise of unemployment following the Greek government-debt crisis and the austerity measures imposed by the Troika led the PASOK-led Ministry of Labour into giving the concept a chance. In 2012, a first pilot program was rolled out for 55,000 unemployed.

== Minister for Combatting Unemployment ==
When in the January 2015 elections, Antonopoulou was elected a Member of the Hellenic Parliament on Syriza's state list, new Greek prime minister Alexis Tsipras appointed her Alternate Minister for Combatting Unemployment. Her portfolio also included the strengthening of the Social and Solidarity Economy sector (SSE) of the economy and she is credited with the enactment of the SSE law which was voted in parliament in October 2016. Antonopoulou is the second Modern Monetary Theory scholar to assume a high-profile post in a government, following her former colleague at Bard College, Stephanie Kelton, who earlier in January was appointed Chief Economist of the U.S. Senate Budget Committee.

In her ministerial office, Antonopoulou was specifically tasked with implementing a nationwide "Job Guarantee" program to combat long-term unemployment, creating at least 300,000 new jobs for the unemployed. The program has been described both by herself and by others as being a centerpiece of a "Greek New Deal" as proposed by the Syriza government.

Outlined in a Levy Institute research project and policy paper from October 2014, the program will be built on the experience of the 2012 pilot project and won't be restricted to reskilling some of the unemployed for the private sector. The program, with precedents only in the Indian Rural Employment Guarantee, is rather set to create publicly funded long-term jobs to allow the unemployed fulfilling socially needed tasks at a minimum wage level. In a February 2015 interview with Deutsche Welle, Antonopoulos pointed out that "the main problem in Greece is lack of aggregate demand and consequent lack of jobs, not lack of skills." Results of the 2012 pilot project suggested that some 500,000 of the totaling 1.3 million unemployed in Greece would be willing to take up such a minimum-wage level job.

== Private life ==
Prior to her arrival in Athens to join the Greek Government's cabinet in September 2015, Antonopoulou lived in New York City since 1977, and is married to her colleague at Bard College, Greek American economist Dimitri B. Papadimitriou. In February 2018, Antonopoulou resigned her position after a controversy involving the fact that she received a rent subsidy despite having significant property holdings.

== Selected publications ==
- "Explaining long term exchange rate behavior in the United States and Japan". Working Papers (250). (with Anwar Shaikh). Levy Economics Institute. September 1998.
- "The Unpaid Care Work–Paid Work Connection". Working Papers (86). Geneva: International Labour Office. May 2009.
- An Alternative Theory of Long-run Exchange Rate Determination. VDM. 2009. ISBN 978-3639156690.
- "The Current Economic and Financial Crisis: A Gender Perspective". Working Paper (562). Levy Economics Institute. May 2009.
- Unpaid Work and the Economy: Gender, Time Use and Poverty in Developing Countries. (with Indira Hirway). Palgrave Macmillan. 2009. ISBN 978-0-230-21730-0.
- Direct Job Creation for Turbulent Times in Greece (Report). (with Dimitri B. Papadimitriou, Taun Toay). Levy Economics Institute. 30 November 2011.
- "Economic Turbulence in Greece". Economic & Political Weekly. XLVII (5). (with Dimitri B. Papadimitriou). 4 February 2012.
- "After Austerity: Measuring the Impact of a Job Guarantee Policy for Greece". Public Policy Brief (138). (with Sofia Adam, Kijong Kim, Thomas Masterson & Dimitri B. Papadimitriou). Levy Economics Institute. 2014.
- Gender Perspectives and Gender Impacts of the Global Economic Crisis. (ed.). Routledge. 2014. ISBN 978-0-415-65817-1.
