= Surplus economics =

Economic theory

Surplus economics is the study of economics based upon the concept that economies operate on the basis of the production of a surplus over basic needs.

Surplus economics is a heterodox economic theory that centres on the implications of economic surplus—production beyond essential needs—and its role in shaping modern exchange economies. Contrary to the orthodox economic focus on scarcity, surplus economics argues that the real economic challenge is managing the consequences of abundance, including inequality, consumption, and motivation. The theory proposes that modern capitalism functions not to allocate scarce resources efficiently, but to absorb and destroy surplus through patterns of production and exchange.

== Overview ==
Traditional economic thought, particularly neoclassical economics, assumes that resources are scarce and that markets function to allocate them efficiently. Surplus economics challenges this premise, contending that modern economies routinely produce more than is needed for survival. This surplus gives rise to new dynamics: exchange becomes the primary mode through which surplus is given value, and the economy evolves to prioritise processes that continually absorb or eliminate surplus, rather than meet essential needs.

== Surplus and exchange ==
Surplus begins when an economy can produce more than is required to meet its essential needs. This includes both a surplus of goods and freed labour. Surplus alone does not create value; it must be exchanged. Thus, wealth is not produced solely by making things, but by realising surplus through exchange. As a result, those who control exchange processes—such as traders, financiers, and corporations—hold disproportionate economic power.

== The Production Paradox ==
A core concept in surplus economics is the production paradox: successful production satisfies demand, which undermines the need for further production. In an exchange economy, this is problematic, as ongoing production relies on unsatisfied needs. To avoid stagnation, economies favour goods and services that are perishable, disposable, or rapidly consumed. This ensures that demand is continually renewed, keeping the system in motion.

== The Poverty Imperative ==
The Poverty Imperative refers to an evolutionary tendency within surplus economies for essential goods to remain scarce or undervalued—not by deliberate design, but as a natural outcome of market incentives under conditions of inequality. In a system where producers must exchange goods to survive or prosper, and where surplus production exceeds subsistence needs, value gravitates toward what is rare, desirable, or profitable—not what is necessary.

As inequality grows, markets evolve in favour of luxury, status, and non-essential commodities that yield higher returns. Producers, responding to competitive pressures and opportunity costs, shift away from low-margin essentials toward high-margin goods. Over time, this behaviour becomes self-reinforcing. Essential goods, though abundant in potential supply, are crowded out or neglected, and their scarcity persists—not because no one needs them, but because serving that need is less economically viable.

In many urban centres, for example, housing development increasingly favours high-yield luxury apartments and investment properties over affordable housing. This pattern is not the result of central planning but of countless individual profit-seeking decisions within a market shaped by surplus and inequality.

The Poverty Imperative thus emerges organically as a stabilising trait in surplus economies, preserving labour discipline and reinforcing exchange-based access to life’s necessities. It masks abundance with artificial scarcity, not through conspiracy, but through the uncoordinated logic of the system itself.

== Re-valuation ==
Re-valuation refers to the economic mechanism by which value is assigned to goods not based on utility or labour input, but on their ability to absorb surplus through exchange. Goods with high turnover rates, status appeal, or planned obsolescence are valued more highly than durable, essential items. This contributes to the systemic devaluation of vital services such as care work, education, or sustainable infrastructure.

== Pattern of production and exchange ==
In a surplus economy, the pattern of production is shaped not by need, but by the imperatives of exchange. The system prioritises goods and services that can be consumed quickly and renewed continually. Industries that produce durable or long-term goods are marginalised unless they adapt to the dominant exchange pattern. Over time, the economy is reoriented around speed, waste, and disposability, ensuring that the surplus is continually absorbed.

== Consumption and motivation ==
With surplus production, fewer individuals are needed for essential tasks. This raises a psychological and political issue: how to motivate work when it is no longer materially necessary? Surplus economics argues that scarcity must be manufactured—through marketing, social stratification, and controlled access to essentials—to maintain labour discipline and suppress democratic control over production.

== Wealth and exchange ==
In surplus economics, wealth is defined not by ownership or utility, but by exchangeability. Goods derive value from their ability to be traded and retraded. The more a product can cycle through exchange, the more wealth it can generate for those who control its distribution. Consequently, the system rewards rapid turnover and penalises long-term use.

== Historical and political implications ==
Surplus economics critiques the ideological foundations of capitalism. It asserts that scarcity, far from being an immutable fact, is a necessary illusion maintained to justify inequality and continued production. Recognising the reality of surplus production would expose the arbitrary nature of economic privilege and open the door to democratic control over the distribution and use of resources.

The theory also suggests that historical moments of surplus have consistently been met with strategies to reinforce elite control—via luxury consumption, the creation of a dependent consuming class, and the suppression of alternative economic models.

== Criticism and reception ==
Surplus economics remains outside the mainstream economic discourse. Critics argue that it underestimates the ongoing relevance of scarcity in certain sectors and oversimplifies the complex motivations behind consumption. Others suggest that while the theory provides a compelling critique of capitalism, it lacks a clear policy framework or viable alternative economic model.

== See also ==
- Planned obsolescence
- Veblen goods
- Political economy
- Post-scarcity economy
- Keynesian economics
- Heterodox economics
