= Debunking Economics =

2001 book by Steve Keen

Debunking Economics: The Naked Emperor of the Social Sciences
- Hardcover edition
- Author: Steve Keen
- Language: English
- Subject: Economics
- Genre: Non-fiction
- Publisher: Zed Books
- Publication date: July 1, 2001
- Media type: Print, e-book
- Pages: 352 pp
- ISBN: 978-1856499927
- OCLC: 925772138
- Dewey Decimal: 330
- LC Class: HB71 .K34 2001

Debunking Economics: The Naked Emperor of the Social Sciences is a book by the economist Steve Keen about the problems with mainstream economics. The book was initially published by Zed Books in 2001, and a revised and updated version was published in 2011. Translated versions were also published in Spanish, French and Chinese. The book is suitable for a general reader, and uses words and figures rather than equations to make its points, but is aimed at those with at least some basic knowledge of economics.

== Description ==
The book strongly criticises many of the key ideas and assumptions of neoclassical economics. It argues that components of the theory such as demand curves, which are supposed to represent the aggregate behaviour of consumers, are theoretical constructs that have little empirical support. Keen questions the conventional theory of the firm, arguing that monopolies can have a useful role. He also revisits the Cambridge capital controversy of the 1960s to argue that ideas such as capital and profit are ill-defined.

One of the book’s main critiques is that macroeconomic models or theories such as the efficient-market hypothesis rely on the assumption that the economy can be viewed as being at or near equilibrium. But according to Keen, this is an over-simplification of the way that the real economy behaves. He argues that economists need to become more familiar with the mathematical tools needed to study dynamical systems, such as nonlinear differential equations.

The final section gives a discussion of possible alternatives, such as Marxian economics, Austrian economics, complexity economics, and so on. Keen concludes that, while none of these theories are completely satisfactory, pursuing them may lead to a more realistic understanding of the economy.

== Reviews ==
In his review of the book, economist John Quiggin wrote:

“[W]hile Keen has made some important critical points, his claim to have ‘debunked’ economics seems premature. On the whole, the most promising response to the problems identified by Keen would seem to be the continued development of more sophisticated and realistic approaches to mainstream economics, and the cultivation of an openminded and skeptical view of the world, in which economic theories are seen as tools to aid understanding rather than as bodies of received revelation.”

In The Review of Austrian Economics, economists Robert Murphy and Gene Callaham wrote that “in his zeal to attack mainstream economics, Keen often overshoots.” However they conclude that “Keen is raising important questions, even if we cannot go along with him on all of his answers.”

Economist Peter Kriesel described the book as "an important book for the non-economist to help understand the limitations and shortcomings of the orthodox neoclassical doctrines which drive most policy and much of the study of economics. However, the reader needs to beware, as some of the arguments are overcomplicated, and some of the claims against the orthodoxy are too extreme."

In an article about the revised 2011 edition, George Monbiot wrote that "the graphs and figures it contains provide a more persuasive account of the causes of the crash and of its likely evolution than anything that has yet emerged from Constitution Avenue or Threadneedle Street."
