= Econocracy =

Econocracy defines a society in which improving the economy has become the main purpose of politics and economic policymaking has become a technocratic process.

The term econocrat was first coined by Peter Self in 1976 to describe those with the professional training that qualifies them in the eyes of society as an expert on the economy. The term Econocracy was then developed by several different writers in 2016 to talk about how the economy and economists themselves have come to play a central role in modern societies.

== Definition ==
In their book The Econocracy: The perils of leaving economics to the experts, Joe Earle, Cahal Moran and Zach Ward-Perkins argue that an econocracy has the following characteristics:

- A society in which a wide range of political goals are defined and valued in terms of their effect on the economy.
- The economy is believed to be a distinct system with its own logic.
- This system requires experts to manage it and so economic policymaking increasingly becomes a technocratic process.

== Relation to democracy ==
In an econocracy politicians prioritise management of the economy and subordinate other policy areas to economic considerations. The perceived competency on the economy of political parties is in turn a key indicator of electoral success. In an econocracy a broad range of activities from the arts, education, health and literature are justified as valuable because they contribute positively to the economy.

Econocracy undermines participatory and deliberative democracy because it delegates decision-making to economic experts and because public discourse is jargon-heavy and expert-led. For example, in the UK, only 12% of respondents in a YouGov poll believe that politicians and the media talk about economics in a way that is accessible. In another poll, less than 40% of respondents could correctly identify the definitions of Gross Domestic Product (GDP) and of quantitative easing, given a list of possible answers.

Relevant to econocracy, globally economics is dominated by a particular perspective often called neoclassical economics. The pluralism in economics movement has highlighted the narrowness of much teaching and research in economics and sought to demonstrate how this lack of intellectual diversity has harmful effects on democracy and social welfare. Many economists reject this claim and seek to demonstrate the intellectual diversity within economics.

Econocracy may be compatible with forms of procedural democracy provided citizens have the requisite level of economic knowledge to make an informed choice about which political parties or individuals best represent their economic interests. The quality of public discourse and public education on economics are important factors in whether this criterion is met.

== History of econocracy ==
The roots of econocracy can be traced back to the invention of the economy in the 1930s. The increase in the power of the state to collect information led to the creation of GDP. This in turn led to the impression that the economy could be accurately measured and controlled. World War Two then brought economists to prominent positions within policy, as they used their mathematical skills to help with the war effort, with this then continuing after the war, as evidence by the creation of the Council of Economic Advisors in the US and the Government Economic Service in the UK, as well as the International Monetary Fund and the World Bank on an international level. Over time politicians also began to focus their messages increasingly around their effect on the economy, with the mentions of ‘the economy’ in winning party manifestos in the UK going from once in 1950 to 59 times in 2015, as well as famous campaign messages based around it, such as “it’s the economy, stupid” in Bill Clinton's 1992 Presidential Campaign.

== Econocracy and elites ==
The concept of a ‘new professional econocracy’ has been used to describe the increasing proportion of leaders in society who have educational or professional experiences of economics or related disciplines such as accounting and business studies. Econocracy, it is argued, advantages contemporary elites in several ways. First, it links disparate elite sectors and institutions together by providing a common ideology, language and policy framework. Second, it operates as a form of governmentality, providing a system of tools, practices and mechanisms to effect a top-down ‘rule by numbers’. Finally, it enables elites to move across sectors and networks more easily. It also facilitates short-term gaming of systems and evasion of long-term accountability.

In terms of membership economics is narrow. For example, in the UK only 1 in 4 academic economists are women, and the ratio is similar for students. A 2010 Royal Economic Society survey found that 82% of UK respondents were white. Furthermore, of 75 Nobel Prize winners in economics only two were not white and one was a woman.

== Econocracy and the rise of populist movements ==
High-profile political events in 2016 appeared to in many ways challenge the legitimacy of economic expertise. Both in Donald Trump’s victorious campaign to become President of the United States and particularly in the United Kingdom’s decision to leave the European Union, large proportions of the public ignored economists’ warnings against such decisions. This has been explained by some as showing that people no longer have trust in expertise (and is linked to the idea of post-truth politics) and by others as caused by economists message simply not getting through to people (due to a supposedly partisan media).
