= Dimitri B. Papadimitriou =

Greek-American economist (born 1946)

President Emeritus, Levy Economics Institute; Jerome Levy Professor of Economics; Executive Vice President Emeritus, Bard College
- Incumbent
- Assumed office 1977

Personal details
- Born: June 9, 1946 (age 80) Thessaloniki, Greece
- Education: Columbia University (BA); New School for Social Research (PhD)

Dimitri B. Papadimitriou (born 9 June 1946, in Thessaloniki) is a Greek and American economist, author, and college professor. He is currently President Emeritus of the Levy Economics Institute of Bard College and Jerome Levy Professor of Economics and Executive Vice President Emeritus, at Bard College. He served as President of the Levy Institute from its inception in 1986 through June 2024.

From 5 November 2016 until February 2018, he was Greece's Minister of Economy and Development in the government of Alexis Tsipras. He also served as provost and vice president of Bard College at Simon's Rock.

== Early life and education ==
Dimitri B. Papadimitriou was born in Thessaloniki, Greece, in 1946. He received his BA from Columbia College, Columbia University, in 1969, and a PhD in Economics from the Graduate Faculty of the New School for Social Research in 1986.

== Business work ==
He worked in the William Penn Life Insurance Company of New York, from 1969 until 1977, where he became Executive Vice-President, Secretary, and Treasurer of the company.

== Academia ==
In 1975/76, Papadimitriou was Adjunct Professor on the Graduate Faculty of the New School for Social Research, He was the Executive Vice President of Bard College (1977-2017), and Jerome Levy Professor of Economics, at Bard College since 1977. He was a Visiting Professor at Smolny College in St. Petersburg, Russia in 2002, and a Distinguished Scholar at the Shanghai Academy of Social Sciences, in China since 2002.

Papadimitriou was the President of the Levy Economics Institute of Bard College from 1986–2024. He now serves the Institute as President Emeritus and Senior Scholar.

In 2019, Papadimitriou served as the Interim Provost of Bard College at Simon's Rock.

Papadimitriou is the author, editor and co-editor of fifteen books and many articles published in various economic journals and on the Levy Institute’s website.

== U.S. Congress ==
Papadimitriou has served as Vice Chairman of the Trade Deficit Review Commission of the United States Congress for the period 1999-2001. He has provided testimony in Congress, as follows:

- "Testimony on Performance-Based Pay", Hearings Subcommittee on Regulation, Business Opportunities, and Technology of the Small Business Committee, U.S. House of Representatives, 103d Congress, 15 July 1994.
- "Testimony on Community Development Banks", Hearings of the Banking Committee, U.S. Senate, 8 September 1993.
- "Testimony on 'Banking of Small Business: Can the Community Development Bank Model Serve Small Firms in Economically Depressed Urban and Rural Communities?'" Subcommittee on Regulation, Business Opportunities, and Technology of the Small Business Committee, U.S. House of Representatives, 103d Congress, 7 June 1993.

== Minister of Economy in Greece ==
Papadimitriou had been co-author of a study of the economy of Greece, published in 2014, where the following "policy options" were suggested: A significant, external, financial assistance to Greece through Marshall Plan–type capital transfers from the European Union; a temporary suspension of interest payments on the public debt of Greece; the use of those financial resources toward increasing demand and employment; the introduction of a parallel financial system based on new government bonds, the so-named "Geuros"; and the adoption of an employer-of-last-resort (ELR) program financed through that parallel financial system. The authors argued that their proposal "seems to provide the best strategy for a recovery, having immediate effects on Greek living standards, while [also] containing the effects on [the Greek] foreign debt.

In November 2016, and taking a leave from Bard College for this reason, Papadimitriou was appointed Greece's Minister of Economy, Development and Tourism in the Syriza-led government of Prime Minister Alexis Tsipras.

On 27 February 2018, Papadimitriou resigned from the Greek government citing "reasons of political sensitivity", following revelations that his wife, Rania Antonopoulos, Alternate Minister for Social Solidarity, who had also resigned the previous days, was the recipient of a legal state stipend for housing expenses.

== Organizations ==
Papadimitriou is chairman of the board of directors of the American Symphony Orchestra, and of the editorial boards of the Journal of Economic Analysis, Challenge, and the Bulletin of Political Economy. He is also a member of the International Board of Advisors of ELIAMEP and of ETERON.

Since 2009, he is a fellow of the Economists for Peace and Security organization.

== Commentator ==
Papadimitriou is a regular contributor to the pages of Greece's Kathimerini daily newspaper, and guest-comments in the Los Angeles Times and The Huffington Post website and on Bloomberg Radio.

== Selected works ==
- Financial Conditions and Macroeconomic Performance: Essays in Honor of Hyman P. Minsky, edited by Steven M. Fazzari and Dimitri B. Papadimitriou. Armonk, NY: M. E. Sharpe, 1992.
- Profits, Deficits and Instability, edited by Dimitri B. Papadimitriou. New York, NY: Macmillan and St. Martin's Press, 1992.
- Poverty and Prosperity in the USA in the Late Twentieth Century, edited by Dimitri B. Papadimitriou and Edward N. Wolff. New York, NY: Macmillan and St. Martin's Press, 1993.
- Aspects of the Distribution of Wealth and Income, edited by Dimitri B. Papadimitriou. New York, NY: Macmillan and St. Martin's Press, 1994.
- Stability in the Financial System, edited by Dimitri B. Papadimitriou, New York, NY: Macmillan and St. Martin's Press, 1996.
- Modernizing Financial Systems, edited by Dimitri B. Papadimitriou. New York, NY: Macmillan and St. Martin's Press, 2000.
- Hyman P. Minsky's Induced Investment and Business Cycles, edited by Dimitri B. Papadimitriou. Northampton, MA: Edward Elgar Publishing, 2004.
- The Distributional Effects of Government Spending and Taxation, edited by Dimitri B. Papadimitriou. New York, NY: Palgrave Macmillan, 2006.
- Government Spending on the Elderly, edited by Dimitri B. Papadimitriou. New York, NY: Palgrave Macmillan, 2007.
- Hyman P. Minsky's Stabilizing an Unstable Economy, edited by Dimitri B. Papadimitriou and L. Randall Wray. New York, NY: McGraw-Hill, 2008.
- Hyman P. Minsky's John Maynard Keynes, edited by Dimitri B. Papadimitriou and L. Randall Wray. New York, NY: McGraw-Hill, 2008.
- The Elgar Companion to Minsky, edited by Dimitri B. Papadimitriou and L. Randall Wray. Northampton, MA: Edward Elgar Publishing, 2010.
- Contributions in Stock-flow Modeling: Essays in Honor of Wynne Godley, edited by Dimitri B. Papadimitriou and Gennaro Zezza. New York, NY: Palgrave Macmillan, 2012.
- Contributions to Economic Theory, Policy, Development and Finance: Essays in Honor of Jan A. Kregel, edited by Dimitri B. Papadimitriou. New York, NY: Palgrave Macmillan, 2014.
