= Kurt W. Rothschild =

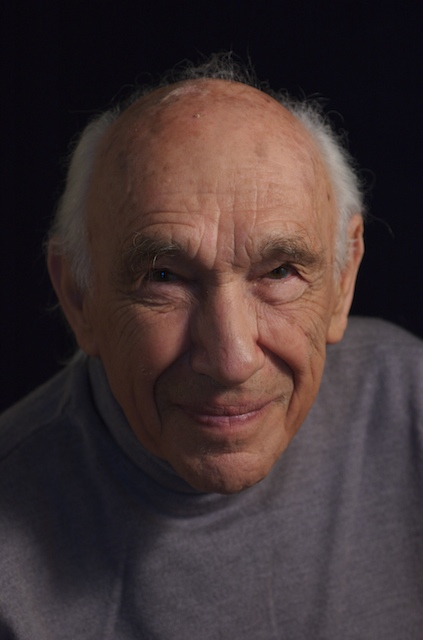

Kurt Wilhelm Rothschild (October 21, 1914 – November 15, 2010) was a well known Austrian-born economist. He lectured at the University of Glasgow in Scotland, and was later a co-founder of the University of Linz. The Kurt Rothschild Prize, awarded for journalism in economics, was founded in his honour in 2016.

== Early life and education ==
Kurt Wilhelm Rothschild was born on October 21, 1914 in Austria.

== Career ==
Rothschild lectured at the University of Glasgow (1938–1947), worked as a researcher at the Austrian Economic Research Institute (1947–1966) and was one founding fathers of the University of Linz, working there from 1966 until 1985. His work in economics was wide ranging running from contributions to microeconomic and macroeconomic theory and history of economic thought to questions of both economic methodology and economic policy. Throughout his career, he advocated pluralism in economics and took a critical approach to what came to be termed neoliberalism and he has been described as a Heterodox or as a Keynesian economist.

== Death and legacy ==
Rothschild died on November 15, 2010, aged 96.

The Kurt Rothschild Prize (Kurt-Rothschild-Preis) for economics journalism is awarded annually by the Karl Renner Institute to commemorate the achievements of Rothschild. It was established by institute and the SPÖ (Social Democratic Party) Parliamentary Club in 2016. It "recognizes scholars whose work has achieved both academic recognition and entered the public debate", with the jury mainly looking for "innovative answers to current economic and socio-political challenges in the spirit of Kurt Rothschild".

== Selected publications ==
- Rothschild, K. W. (1947). "Price theory and oligopoly". The Economic Journal: 299–320. doi:10.2307/2225674. JSTOR 2225674.
- Rothschild, K. W. (1971). Power in economics. Penguin.
- Rothschild, K. W. (1954). The theory of wages. Blackwell.
