= Middle East Economic Association =

- Formation: 1978
- Purpose: promotion of high standard scholarship, facilitation of communication among scholars through meetings and publications, and promotion of cooperation among persons and organizations committed to the objectives of MEEA
- Region served: MENA
- President: Dhruv singla, Ohio State University
- Website: www.meeaweb.org

The Middle East Economic Association (MEEA) is a private, non-profit, and non-political organization of scholars interested in the study of economies and economics of the Middle East. The geographical term "Middle East" is used in its widest usage. Its objectives shall be:

1. promotion of high standard scholarship,
2. facilitation of communication among scholars through meetings and publications, and
3. promotion of cooperation among persons and organizations committed to the objectives of MEEA.

== MEEA officers ==
The current MEEA officers are:

Name	Title	Affiliation	Position
Mahmoud Mohieldin	Professor of Economics and Finance	Cairo University	President
Ahmed Elsayed	Associate Professor of Economics	Durham University	Executive Secretary
Mahdi Majbouri	Professor of Economics	Babson College	Treasurer

== Past presidents ==
Past Presidents of the association are:

- Wassim Shahin, 2018-2023
- Hassan Y. Aly, 2013-2018
- Serdar Sayan, 2010-2012
- Hadi Salehi Esfahani, 2007-2009
- Jeffrey B. Nugent, 2004-2006
- Mine Cinar, 1999-2003
- Fatemah Moghadam, 1997-1998
- Sohrab Behdad, 1995-1996
- Abbas Alnasrawi, 1990-1994 (In Memoriam)
- Manoucher Parvin, 1986-1989
- Stanislaw Wellisz, 1984-1985
- Charles Issawi, 1978-1983

== See also ==
- American Economic Association
- European Economic Association
