= The Economics Anti-Textbook =

Economics textbook

- Author: Roderick Hill and Tony Myatt
- Language: English
- Subject: Economics
- Publisher: Zed Books
- Publication date: 2010
- ISBN: 1-84277-939-7

The Economics Anti-Textbook is both an introduction to, and critique of the typical approaches to economics teaching, written by Roderick Hill and Tony Myatt in 2010. The main thrust of the authors' argument is that basic economics courses, being centered on models of perfect competition, are biased towards the support of free market or laissez-faire ideologies, and neglect to mention conflicting evidence or give sufficient coverage of alternative descriptive models. This book has been updated and superseded by The Microeconomics Anti-Textbook and The Macroeconomics Anti-Textbook, by the same authors.

== Goals ==
The book seeks to both teach economic material and also to counter what is written in other economics texts. The book encourages its readers to become skeptics, urging critical thinking against the hegemony of rigid free market ideology.

The book advocates for empiricism in economics and demonstrates the abundance of un-empirical free-market ideology in undergraduate economics classes. Many authors have since repeated similar concerns about economics education.

== Structure ==
Each chapter begins with a dense but readable summary of common neoclassical economic textbook teaching on a topic, and then proceeds to discuss the limitations of these teachings and their public policy implications.

Throughout the text are suggested "Questions for Your Professor" designed "to reveal the ignorance of neoclassical economics professors of their own discipline, their lack of understanding of alternative theories and their wilful neglect of conflicting evidence."

== Content ==
The book primarily discusses major topics of microeconomics, including consumer behavior, firm behavior, market structure, externalities, income distribution, government, and international trade. An appendix discusses the 2008 financial crisis in light of the earlier discussions of markets.

=== Example ===
An example of the book's approach is the theories surrounding minimum wage. Classical micro-economic theory dictates that in a perfectly competitive market, raising the legal minimum wage will increase unemployment, as it prevents the hire of workers whose market value falls below the legal minimum. Society therefore loses from the imposition of a minimum wage due to the loss of allocative efficiency. While real markets may not be perfectly competitive, the model of perfect competition provides a good approximation to real market behaviour. A number of counterarguments to this are given.

1. The classical model, while coherent, is only a hypothesis which should be experimentally verified before being accepted as fact.
2. Over 30 years of econometric studies have failed to conclusively prove or disprove the hypothesis that raising minimum wage will increase unemployment. The theory is surrounded by a "protective belt of assumptions" which makes conducting such studies near impossible.
3. The existence of market friction, asymmetric information and search costs all violate the assumptions of perfect competition. The authors argue that monopolistic price theories may depict reality better than the perfectly competitive model. In this case it can be shown that raising a minimum wage can in some circumstances, lead to a decrease in unemployment.
4. The existence of multiple equilibria in a supply/demand system may mean that imposition of a minimum wage forces the system over a tipping point from a less efficient to a more efficient equilibrium.
5. Arguments in favour of increasing allocative efficiency were in any case constructed in an era where society was less wealthy than it is today. Recent studies have shown that for well-off societies, the happiness of a population has little correlation with its absolute wealth. Therefore, efficiency may not necessarily be an important goal of resource allocation in any case. In any case, efficient markets can have morally undesirable outcomes.

=== Other areas ===
Later chapters explore the concept of bounded rationality and how it confounds classical arguments in favour of laissez faire; in particular it is noted that the very existence of an advertising industry disproves rational behaviour. Arguments from the field of game theory explain limited rationality and the balance of power of corporations over the individual.

=== Conclusion ===
Overall, the authors argue – with reference to Thomas Kuhn's The Structure of Scientific Revolutions – that the existing economic paradigm is due for a change. The book presents their own paradigm for interpreting economic behaviour.

== Context ==
The book is one of several textbooks comparing mainstream and heterodox perspectives on economics, along with Cohn (2007) and Bougrine & Seccareccia (2010). Other similar textbooks offering alternative perspectives to mainstream economics include Earl (1995) and Earl & Wakeley (2005). None of these have yet achieved widespread adoption. A thorough review of critical economics books relevant to 21st century economies recommended this book as a textbook in real-world economics which supports a broad view of economic perspectives, along with Nelson & Harris (2009), Goodwin et al. (2009), and Gowdy (2009) It is one of the most popular works critiquing neoclassical economics, along with and Keen (2001).

The book was part of a movement of economists attempting to offer explanations of economic theory to the general public in the wake of the Great Recession.

== Reviews ==
Despite not yet being reviewed in mainstream journals, as of February 2011 the introductory chapter has received 13,000 views on stumbleupon and the book has attracted positive comment on various blogs.

The Huffington Post especially recommended the last chapter on trade and globalization. In the journal Labour / Le Travail, Jim Stanford described it as a "needed antidote to the unreal and infuriating doctrines of fundamentalist free-market theory" taught in standard introductory economics courses and textbooks. On the blog Progressive Economics, Professor of Green Political Economy at Queen's University, Belfast, John Barry said, "it should be on all undergraduate economics courses in the spirit of pluralism in economic thinking." In the International Journal for Pluralism and Economics Education, Swiss economic sociologist Michael Derrer called it a "a genuine treasure of well-researched and referenced arguments". He suggested to the authors to write a second edition in a less scholarly writing style, in order to reach a global audience.
