= Alfred Eichner =

Alfred S. Eichner
- Born: May 23, 1937; Washington, D.C.
- Died: February 10, 1988 (aged 50)

Academic background
- Influences: J. M. Keynes, Michał Kalecki, Joan Robinson

Academic work
- School or tradition: Post Keynesian economics
- Notable ideas: Post Keynesian Economics, Theory of the Megacorp, theory of investment and pricing, macrodynamics, Post Keynesian Microfoundations of Macroeconomics

Alfred S. Eichner (March 23, 1937 – February 10, 1988) was an American post-Keynesian economist who challenged the neoclassical price mechanism and asserted that prices are not set through supply and demand but rather through mark-up pricing.

Eichner is one of the founders of the post-Keynesian school of economics and was a professor at Rutgers University at the time of his death. Eichner's writings and advocacy of thought, differed with the theories of John Maynard Keynes, who was an advocate of government intervention in the free market and proponent of public spending to increase employment. Eichner argued that investment was the key to economic expansion. He was considered an advocate of the concept that government incomes policy should prevent inflationary wage and price settlements in connection to the customary fiscal and monetary means of regulating the economy.

He is noted for his book The Megacorp and Oligopoly (1976), Toward a new economics: essays in post-Keynesian and institutionalist theory (1985). His Macrodynamics of Advanced Market Economies (1987) contains chapters on dynamics and growth, investment, finance and income distribution.

== Life and work ==
Eichner was born in Washington, D.C., in the United States. He received his doctorate in economics from Columbia University. He taught at Columbia from 1962 until 1971. Later he taught at SUNY Purchase (1971–1980), and then joined the Rutgers University faculty.

Some books edited by Eichner include A Guide to Post-Keynesian Economics, Why Economics Is Not Yet a Science, and The Macrodynamics of Advanced Market Economies. Eichner testified before Congressional and other legislative committees.

== Historian of culture and of economics ==
Together with Eli Ginzberg, a professor of economics at Columbia, Eichner authored an economic history of African Americans, The Troublesome Presence: The American Democracy and the Negro, published in 1964.

These co-authors wrote that... "of the several million persons who reached Great Britain's North American colonies before 1776, it is conservatively estimated that close to 80 percent arrived under some form of servitude."

== Views on academic economics ==
Alfred Eichner in Why Economics Is Not Yet a Science offers the following commentary on the discipline of economics as a social system:

....'The refusal to abandon the myth of the market as a self-regulating system is not the result of a conspiracy on the part of the "establishment" in economics. It is not even a choice that any individual economist is necessarily aware of making. Rather it is the way economics operates as a social system—including the way new members of the establishment are selected—retaining its place within the larger society by perpetuating a set of ideas which have been found useful by that society, however dysfunctional the same set of ideas may be from a scientific understanding of how the economic system works. In other words, economics is unwilling to adhere to the epistemological principles which distinguish scientific from other types of intellectual activity because this might jeopardize the position of economists within the larger society as the defender of the dominant faith. This situation in which economists find themselves is therefore not unlike that of many natural scientists who, when faced with mounting evidence in support of first, the Copernican theory of the universe and then, later, the Darwinian theory of evolution, had to decide whether undermining the revelatory basis of Judeo-Christian ethics was not too great a price to pay for being able to reveal the truth.'

== Books and articles ==
- Eichner, A. S. (1988), 'Full employment and the human element', Challenge 31(3), 4–8.
- Eichner, A. S. (1987), "The Macrodynamics of Advanced Market Economies", M.E. Sharpe, New York.
- Eichner, A. S. (1986), 'Can Economics Become a Science?', Challenge 29(5), 4–12.
- Eichner, A. S. (1985), Toward a New Economics: Essays in Post-Keynesian and Institutionalist Theory, M.E. Sharpe, Armonk, NY.
- Eichner, A. S. (1985), 'Towards an Empirically Valid Economics', Eastern Economic Journal 11(4), 437–449.
- Eichner, A. S. (1984), 'Budgeting for Peace and Growth', Challenge 26(6), 9–20.
- Eichner, A. S. (1984), 'Joan Robinson's Legacy', Challenge 27(2), 42–46.
- Eichner, A. S. ed. (1983), Why Economics is not Yet a Science, M.E. Sharpe, New York.
- Eichner, A. S. (1983), 'The micro foundations of the corporate economy', Managerial and Decision Economics 4(3), 136–152.
- Eichner, A. S. ed. (1978), A Guide to Post-Keynesian Economics, M.E, Sharpe.
- Eichner, A. S. (1978), 'Post-Keynesian Theory: An Introduction', Challenge 21(2), 4–17.
- Eichner, A. S. (1976), The Megacorp and Oligopoly: Micro Foundations of Macro Dynamics, Cambridge University Press, Cambridge, UK.
- Eichner, A. S. (1975), 'A Theory of the Determination of the Mark-Up Under Oligopoly: A Further Reply', Economic Journal 85, 149–150.
- Eichner, A. S. & Kregel, J. A. (1975), 'An Essay on Post-Keynesian Theory: A New Paradigm in Economics', Journal of Economic Literature 13(4), 1293–1314.
- Eichner, A. S. (1974), 'Determination of the Mark-Up Under Oligopoly: A Reply', Economic Journal 84, 974–980.
- Eichner, A. S. (1973), 'Theory of the Determination of the Mark-Up Under Oligopoly', Economic Journal 83, 1184–1200.
- Eichner, A. S. (1969), The Emergence of Oligopoly: Sugar Refining as a Case Study, The Johns Hopkins Press, Baltimore and London.
- Eli Ginzberg and Eichner, A. S. (1964), The Troublesome Presence: American Democracy and the Negro. Free Press of Glencoe.

== See also ==
- Heterodox economics
- Post-Keynesian
