= Economic Thought =

- Discipline: Economics
- Language: English
- Edited by: Sheila Dow, John King, John Latsis, Annalisa Rosselli

Publication details
- History: 2012–present
- Publisher: World Economics Association
- Frequency: Biannual
- Open access: Yes

Standard abbreviations
- ISO 4: Econ. Thought

Indexing
- ISSN: 2049-3509
- OCLC no.: 809833644

Links
- Journal homepage

Economic Thought is a biannual peer-reviewed open access academic journal. It was established in 2012 and is published by the World Economics Association.

An innovative feature of the journal is its Open Peer Discussion forum. Submitted papers that meet an acceptable standard of quality are first posted on the forum before a decision is taken on publication.

The journal is abstracted/indexed in Scopus, Research Papers in Economics, Directory of Open Access Journals, PhilPapers, and EconLit.
