= Association for Evolutionary Economics =

The Association for Evolutionary Economics (AFEE) is an international organization of economists working in the institutionalist and evolutionary traditions of Thorstein Veblen, John R. Commons and Wesley Mitchell. It is part of the Allied Social Science Associations (ASSA), a group of approximately 63 organizations including the American Economics Association (AEA), that holds a three-day meeting each January.

== History ==
AFEE originated in 1959 as an informal group that met in a rump session of the ASSA meetings. They called themselves the Wardman Group after the Wardman Park Hotel in Washington D.C. where the initial 1959 meeting took place.

The founding members were economists who found it increasingly difficult to get their papers included on sessions sponsored by the American Economics Association. Although the AEA was founded by the institutionalist economist Richard T. Ely, by the 1950s it had drifted away from the institutionalist approach and towards abstract mathematical modelling. The members of AFEE are sometimes called "old institutionalists" to distinguish them from the followers of New Institutional Economics.

The Wardman Group renamed itself the Association for Evolutionary Economics (AFEE) in 1965. Clarence E. Ayres was elected the first president and he presided over presentations at the ASSA meetings in San Francisco in December 1966. In 1967, AFEE began publishing a quarterly academic journal, the Journal of Economic Issues.

In the 1970s, the "old institutionalists" competed with the Marxists and the Post Keynesians for prominence within heterodox economics but by the 1980s they began to be noticed once again. In 1979, some members of AFEE who thought it had deviated too far from its roots, formed a sister organization, the Association for Institutionalist Thought (AFIT). The stature of old, or original, institutional economics was further strengthened by the formation in 1988 of the European Association for Evolutionary Political Economy.

== Aims and scope ==
AFEE views itself as running parallel to the AEA in covering all areas of economics. It places less stress on mathematical model building and more on a realistic analysis of economic policy issues. It is open to interdisciplinary approaches that incorporate insights from history, psychology, management science and political science. Moreover, it stresses the importance of broadening the scope of economics to consider questions of economic ends, as well as economic means. Since its founding, AFEE has confronted issues of environmental degradation, inequality, corporate power, the negative effect of advertising and the limitations of economic growth as a measure of economic success.

== Awards and scholarships ==
The Veblen-Commons Award is given annually in recognition of the contributions made by an outstanding scholar in the field of evolutionary institutional economics. Past recipients include Gunnar Myrdal, John Kenneth Galbraith, Gardiner Means, and Hyman Minsky.

The James H. Street Latin American Scholarship is awarded to a person residing in Latin America and working within the tradition of original institutional economics. The James H. Street scholar is awarded round trip transportation and accommodation at the ASSA meetings and given the opportunity to present his or her work.

The Clarence E. Ayres Award is awarded to a promising international scholar working within the tradition of original institutional economics. The Ayres scholar is awarded round trip transportation and accommodation at the ASSA meetings and given the opportunity to present his or her work.
