= Journal of Economic Issues =

- Discipline: Economics
- Language: English
- Edited by: William Waller

Publication details
- History: 1967-present
- Publisher: Taylor & Francis
- Frequency: Quarterly
- Impact factor: 0.7 (2022)

Standard abbreviations
- ISO 4: J. Econ. Issues

Indexing
- ISSN: 0021-3624
- JSTOR: 00213624

Links
- Journal homepage; Online access

The Journal of Economic Issues is an academic journal of economics. The current editor-in-chief is William Waller (Hobart and William Smith Colleges). It is published by Taylor & Francis on behalf of the Association for Evolutionary Economics.
