= Uskali Mäki =

Finnish economist professor

Ismo Uskali Mäki (born 8 February 1951 Helsinki) is a Finnish professor in the Department of Political and Economic Studies (Philosophy) at the University of Helsinki. He is also director of the Trends and tensions in Intellectual Integration centre, which was recently nominated "Finnish Centre of Excellence" in the Philosophy of the Social Sciences. Previous posts and roles have included his being a professor of philosophy at the Erasmus University of Rotterdam where he directed the Erasmus Institute for Philosophy and Economics and his being the editor of the Journal of Economic Methodology. In 1990–1991, Mäki was a Fellow at the Swedish Collegium for Advanced Study in Uppsala, Sweden.

Mäki's main research interests lie in the methodology of economics and the philosophy of the sciences including social sciences with his approach typically being described as a realist philosophy of economics. Mäki is currently serving as an Academy Professor for the Academy of Finland.

== Selected publications ==
Mäki, U., Gustafsson, B., & Knudsen, C. (1993). Rationality, institutions, and economic methodology. London: Routledge.
