= Heterodox economics =

Rare schools of economic thought

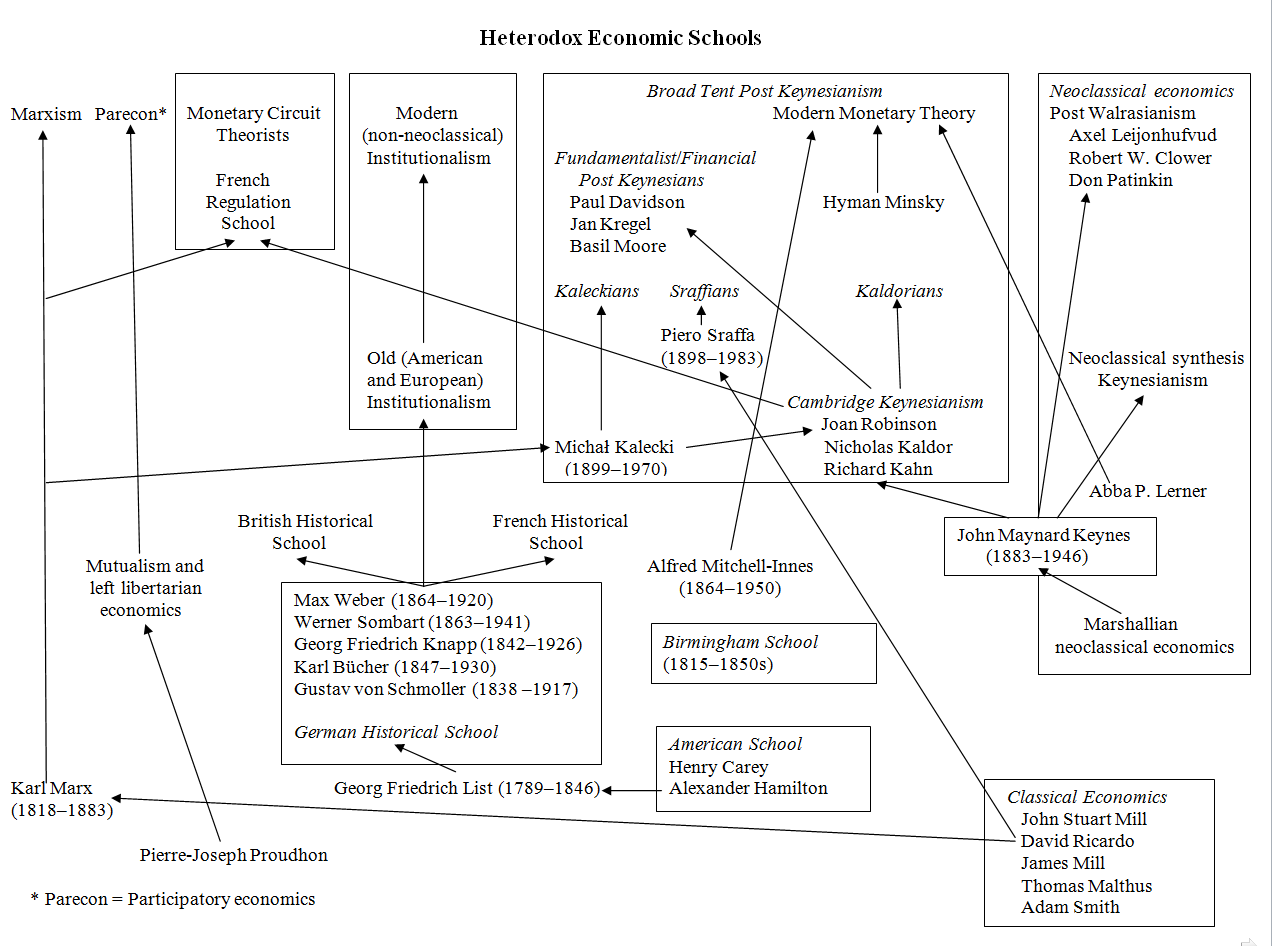
Heterodox economics family tree

Heterodox economics is a broad, relative term referring to schools of economic thought which are not commonly perceived as belonging to mainstream economics. There is no absolute definition of what constitutes heterodox economic thought, as it is defined in contrast to the most prominent, influential or popular schools of thought in a given time and place.

Groups typically classed as heterodox in current discourse include the Austrian, ecological, (Note: Not to be confused with environmental economics.) Marxist-historical, post-Keynesian, and modern monetary (neo-chartalist) approaches.

Four frames of analysis have been highlighted for their importance to heterodox thought: history, natural systems, uncertainty, and power.

Economist Frederic S. Lee, in 2007 believed 5 to 10 percent of the American economists were heterodox, from both left and right-wing schools. Performing a computational text analysis of PhD dissertations between 2010 and 2017 at five top-ranking universities, economist Sam de Muijnck, in a study published in 2024, found that only 10 percent of the of the dissertations engage with heterodox economics, while about a quarter do so with nonorthodox mainstream economics.

== History ==
In the mid-19th century, such thinkers as Auguste Comte, Thomas Carlyle, John Ruskin and Karl Marx made early critiques of orthodox economy. A number of heterodox schools of economic thought challenged the dominance of neoclassical economics after the neoclassical revolution of the 1870s. In addition to socialist critics of capitalism, heterodox schools in this period included advocates of various forms of mercantilism, such as the American School dissenters from neoclassical methodology such as the historical school, and advocates of unorthodox monetary theories such as social credit.

Physical scientists and biologists were the first individuals to use energy flows to explain social and economic development. Joseph Henry, an American physicist and first secretary of the Smithsonian Institution, remarked that the "fundamental principle of political economy is that the physical labor of man can only be ameliorated by… the transformation of matter from a crude state to an artificial condition...by expending what is called power or energy."

The rise, and absorption into the mainstream of Keynesian economics, which appeared to provide a more coherent policy response to unemployment than unorthodox monetary or trade policies, contributed to the decline of interest in these schools.

After 1945, the neoclassical synthesis of Keynesian and neoclassical economics resulted in a clearly defined mainstream position based on a division of the field into microeconomics (generally neoclassical but with a newly developed theory of market failure) and macroeconomics (divided between Keynesian and monetarist views on such issues as the role of monetary policy). Austrians and post-Keynesians who dissented from this synthesis emerged as clearly defined heterodox schools. In addition, the Marxist and institutionalist schools remained active but with limited acceptance or credibility.

Up to 1980 the most notable themes of heterodox economics in its various forms included:

1. rejection of the atomistic individual conception in favor of a socially embedded individual conception;
2. emphasis on time as an irreversible historical process;
3. reasoning in terms of mutual influences between individuals and social structures.

From approximately 1980 mainstream economics has been significantly influenced by a number of new research programs, including behavioral economics, complexity economics, evolutionary economics, experimental economics, and neuroeconomics. One key development has been an epistemic turn away from theory towards an empirically driven approach focused centrally on questions of causal inference. As a consequence, some heterodox economists, such as John B. Davis, proposed that the definition of heterodox economics has to be adapted to this new, more complex reality:

...heterodox economics post-1980 is a complex structure, being composed out of two broadly different kinds of heterodox work, each internally differentiated with a number of research programs having different historical origins and orientations: the traditional left heterodoxy familiar to most and the 'new heterodoxy' resulting from other science imports.

== Rejection of neoclassical economics ==
Heterodox economics is not a school of thought in its own right, but rather an umbrella term for a set of various, diverse schools of economic thought. Despite their diversity, heterodox schools often consider neoclassical economics to be a flawed or invalid approach to understanding economics. The reasons behind this rejection may vary. According to economist Marcos Lisboa, these criticisms share a common focus: they point to the existence of certain hypotheses deemed essential to neoclassical economics —hypotheses which, according to the critics, are either empirically false or carry implications incompatible with the nature of a market economy. Lisboa claimed that there are several misconceptions within these critiques. In some instances, the hypothesis being challenged is never actually employed in core neoclassical models. In other cases, the nature and implications of the hypotheses in question differ radically from how they are characterized by heterodox authors. Ultimately, according to him, virtually none of the hypotheses discussed by these critics are essential to the neoclassical tradition.

=== Criticism of the neoclassical model of individual behavior ===
One of the most broadly accepted principles of neoclassical economics is the assumption of the "rationality of economic agents". Indeed, for a number of economists, the notion of rational maximizing behavior is taken to be synonymous with economic behavior (Hirshleifer 1984). When some economists' studies do not embrace the rationality assumption, they are seen as placing the analyses outside the boundaries of the neoclassical economics discipline (Landsberg 1989, 596). Neoclassical economics begins with the a priori assumptions that agents are rational and that they seek to maximize their individual utility (or profits) subject to environmental constraints. These assumptions provide the backbone for rational choice theory.

Many heterodox schools are critical of the homo economicus model of human behavior used in the standard neoclassical model. A typical version of the critique is that of Satya Gabriel:

Neoclassical economic theory is grounded in a particular conception of human psychology, agency or decision-making. It is assumed that all human beings make economic decisions so as to maximize pleasure or utility. Some heterodox theories reject this basic assumption of neoclassical theory, arguing for alternative understandings of how economic decisions are made and/or how human psychology works. It is possible to accept the notion that humans are pleasure seeking machines, yet reject the idea that economic decisions are governed by such pleasure seeking. Human beings may, for example, be unable to make choices consistent with pleasure maximization due to social constraints and/or coercion. Humans may also be unable to correctly assess the choice points that are most likely to lead to maximum pleasure, even if they are unconstrained (except in budgetary terms) in making such choices. And it is also possible that the notion of pleasure seeking is itself a meaningless assumption because it is either impossible to test or too general to refute. Economic theories that reject the basic assumption of economic decisions as the outcome of pleasure maximization are heterodox.

Shiozawa emphasizes that economic agents act in a complex world and it is therefore impossible for them to attain maximal utility point. They instead behave as if there are repertoires of many ready-made rules, one of which they choose according to the relevant situation.

=== Criticism of the neoclassical model of market equilibrium ===
In microeconomic theory, cost-minimization by consumers and by firms implies the existence of supply and demand correspondences for which market clearing equilibrium prices exist, if there are large numbers of consumers and producers. Under convexity assumptions or under some marginal-cost pricing rules, each equilibrium will be Pareto efficient: In large economies, non-convexity also leads to quasi-equilibria that are nearly efficient.

However, the concept of market equilibrium has been criticized by Austrians, post-Keynesians and others, who object to applications of microeconomic theory to real-world markets, when such markets are not usefully approximated by microeconomic models. Heterodox economists assert that micro-economic models rarely capture reality.

Mainstream microeconomics may be defined in terms of optimization and equilibrium, following the approaches of Paul Samuelson and Hal Varian. On the other hand, heterodox economics may be labeled as falling into the nexus of institutions, history, and social structure.

== Most recent developments ==
Over the past two decades, leading heterodox thinkers have moved beyond the established paradigms of Austrian, Feminist, Institutional-Evolutionary, Marxian, Post Keynesian, Radical, Social, and Sraffian economics—opening up new lines of analysis, criticism, and dialogue among dissenting schools of thought. This cross-fertilization of ideas is creating a new generation of scholarship in which novel combinations of heterodox ideas are being brought to bear on important contemporary and historical problems, such as socially grounded reconstructions of the individual in economic theory; the goals and tools of economic measurement and professional ethics; the complexities of policymaking in today's global political economy; and innovative connections among formerly separate theoretical traditions (Marxian, Austrian, feminist, ecological, Sraffian, institutionalist, and post-Keynesian) (for a review of post-Keynesian economics, see Lavoie (1992); Rochon (1999)).

David Colander, an advocate of complexity economics, argues that the ideas of heterodox economists are now being discussed in the mainstream without mention of the heterodox economists, because the tools to analyze institutions, uncertainty, and other factors have now been developed by the mainstream. He suggests that heterodox economists should embrace rigorous mathematics and attempt to work from within the mainstream, rather than treating it as an enemy.

Some schools of heterodox economic thought have also taken a transdisciplinary approach. Thermoeconomics is based on the claim that human economic processes are governed by the second law of thermodynamics. The posited relationship between economic theory, energy and entropy, has been extended further by systems scientists to explain the role of energy in biological evolution in terms of such economic criteria as productivity, efficiency, and especially the costs and benefits of the various mechanisms for capturing and utilizing available energy to build biomass and do work. Economist Frederic S. Lee in 2007 believed 5 to 10 percent of American economists were heterodox, from both left- and right-wing schools.

Various student movements have emerged in response to the exclusion of heterodox economics in the curricula of most economics degrees. The International Student Initiative for Pluralist Economics was set up as an umbrella network for various smaller university groups such as Rethinking Economics to promote pluralism in economics, including more heterodox approaches.

== Fields of heterodox economic thought ==
- Austrian economics #
- Binary economics
- Bioeconomics
- Buddhist economics
- Complexity economics
- Co-operative economics
- Distributism
- Ecological economics §
- Evolutionary economics # § (partly within mainstream economics)
- Econophysics
- Feminist economics # §
- Freiwirtschaft
- Georgism
- General Economy
- Gift Economy
- Green Economics
- Humanistic economics
- Innovation Economics
- Institutional economics # §
- Islamic economics
- Marxian economics #
- Mutualism
- Neuroeconomics
- Participatory economics
- Political Economy
- Post-Keynesian economics § including Modern Monetary Theory and Circuitism
- Post scarcity
- Pluralism in economics
- Resource-based economics – not to be confused with a resource-based economy
- Real-world economics
- Sharing economics
- Socialist economics #
- Social economics (partially heterodox usage)
- Surplus Economics Theory
- Sraffian economics #
- Technocracy (Energy Accounting)
- Thermoeconomics
- Mouvement Anti-Utilitariste dans les Sciences Sociales

# Listed in Journal of Economic Literature codes scrolled to at JEL: B5 – Current Heterodox Approaches.

§ Listed in The New Palgrave Dictionary of Economics

Some schools in the social sciences aim to promote certain perspectives: classical and modern political economy; economic sociology and anthropology; gender and racial issues in economics; and so on.

=== Notable heterodox economists ===
- Alfred Eichner
- Alice Amsden
- Aníbal Pinto
- Anwar Shaikh
- Bernard Lonergan
- Bill Mitchell
- Bryan Caplan
- Carlota Perez
- Carolina Alves
- Celso Furtado
- Dani Rodrik
- David Harvey
- Duncan Foley
- E. F. Schumacher
- Edward Nell
- Esther Dweck
- F.A. Hayek
- Frank Stilwell
- Franklin Serrano
- Frederic S. Lee
- Frederick Soddy
- G.L.S. Shackle
- Hans Singer
- Ha-Joon Chang
- Heinz Kurz
- Henry George
- Herman Daly
- Hyman Minsky
- Jack Amariglio
- Jeremy Rifkin
- Joan Robinson
- John Bellamy Foster
- John Komlos
- Joseph Schumpeter
- Karl Marx
- Kate Raworth
- Lance Taylor
- Ludwig Lachmann
- Ludwig von Mises
- Maria da Conceição Tavares
- Mariana Mazzucato
- Mason Gaffney
- Michael Albert
- Michael Hudson
- Michael Perelman
- Michał Kalecki
- Murray Rothbard
- Mushtaq Khan
- Nelson Barbosa
- Nicholas Georgescu-Roegen
- Nicolaus Tideman
- Paul A. Baran
- Paul Cockshott
- Paul Sweezy
- Peter Navarro
- Piero Sraffa
- Rania Antonopoulos
- Raúl Prebisch
- Richard D. Wolff
- Robin Hahnel
- Ruy Mauro Marini
- Simon Zadek
- Stephanie Kelton
- Stephen Resnick
- Theotônio dos Santos
- Thorstein Veblen
- Tony Lawson
- Yanis Varoufakis
- Yusif Sayigh

== See also ==
- Association for Evolutionary Economics
- Reform and opening up
- Degrowth
- EAEPE
- Foundations of Real-World Economics
- Happiness economics
- Humanistic economics
- Kinetic exchange models of markets
- Pluralism in economics
- Post-autistic economics
- Post-growth
- Real-world economics review
- Real-world economics
- Surplus economics
