= Foundations of Real-World Economics =

Book by John Komlos

Foundations of Real‑World Economics
- Author: John Komlos
- Genre: Economics
- Published: 3rd edition, 2023
- Publisher: Routledge a subsidiary of Taylor and Francis
- Pages: 396
- ISBN: 1351584715

Foundations of Real-World Economics: What Every Economics Student Needs to Know is a 2023 book by John Komlos in which the author argues that the turbulence of the 21st century, including the dot-com bubble, the 2008 financial crisis, the rise of right-wing populism, COVID-19 pandemic, and the Russo-Ukrainian War, cannot be adequately understood with conventional 20th-century economic thinking.

== Content ==
The book is critical of cutting taxes and diminishing the size of government. The book is also critical of support for deregulation that the author argues culminated in the Meltdown of 2008. The book is also critical of globalization.

The text asserts that the modern global economy is a collection of oligopolies more than a competitive market framework.

The book draws on prominent economic thinkers such as Kahneman on behavioral economics, Galbraith on the need for countervailing power, Case & Deaton on deaths of despair, Minsky on financial instability, Krugman on new trade theory, Rawls on justice, Stiglitz on the hollowing out of the middle class, Simon on bounded rationality, and Veblen on conspicuous consumption. It also advocates for a humanistic economics and for a "capitalism with a human face" (an analogy to socialism with a human face).

The book has been translated into several languages, including: Russian, German, Hungarian, Romanian, and Chinese.
