= Humanistic economics =

Distinct pattern of economic thought

Humanistic economics is a distinct pattern of economic thought with old historical roots that have been more recently invigorated by E. F. Schumacher's Small Is Beautiful: Economics as if People Mattered (1973). Proponents argue for "persons-first" economic theories as opposed to mainstream economic theories which are understood as often emphasizing financial gain over human well-being. In particular, the overly abstract human image implicit in mainstream economics is critically analyzed and instead it attempts a rethinking of economic principles, policies and institutions based on a richer and more balanced view of human nature.

== Overview ==
Humanistic economics can be described as a perspective that imbues elements of humanistic psychology, moral philosophy, political science, sociology and common sense into traditional economic thought. Or, to define it more formally, contemporary humanistic economics seeks to:

1. describe, analyze and critically assess prevailing socio-economic institutions and policies
2. provide normative (value) guidelines on how to improve them in terms of human (not merely "economic") well-being

In the process, basic human needs, human rights, human dignity, community, cooperation, economic democracy and economic sustainability provide the framework. At its foundation, humanistic economics seeks to replace atomistic economic man with a more holistic human image. One approach is broadly based on Abraham Maslow’s humanistic psychology.

== Characteristic elements ==
According to Mark A. Lutz, five characteristic elements of humanistic economics can be summarized as follows:

- A history that goes back two centuries and starts with the new political economy of J.C.L. Simonde de Sismondi and extends to E.F. Schumacher and beyond.
- A critique of contemporary micro- and macroeconomic theories, particularly those relating to efficiency, equality, agency, motivation, work, unemployment, comparative advantage, globalization, ecology, social accounting and macroeconomic stability.
- A critical analysis of socio-economic institutions, including property, corporate power, the workplace, and the global institutions governing international trade and finance.
- A normative analysis based on human dignity and basic rights that addresses issues of poverty amidst plenty, economic democracy, ecological sustainability and socio-economic development.
- A realist philosophical discourse opposed to all kinds of nominalism, relativism, scientific positivism, and post-modernism.

As part of a series of efforts by Prof. Jaime Lagunez, World Medicine was created - a company to be owned by all citizens of the world. Lagunez has offered to include results of his research on cancer and vs HIV to be sold by the company. A short powerpoint presentation speaks about his work.

== See also ==
- Reform and opening up
- Happiness economics
- Participation income
