= Balance of payments =

Difference between the inflow and outflow of money to a country at a given time

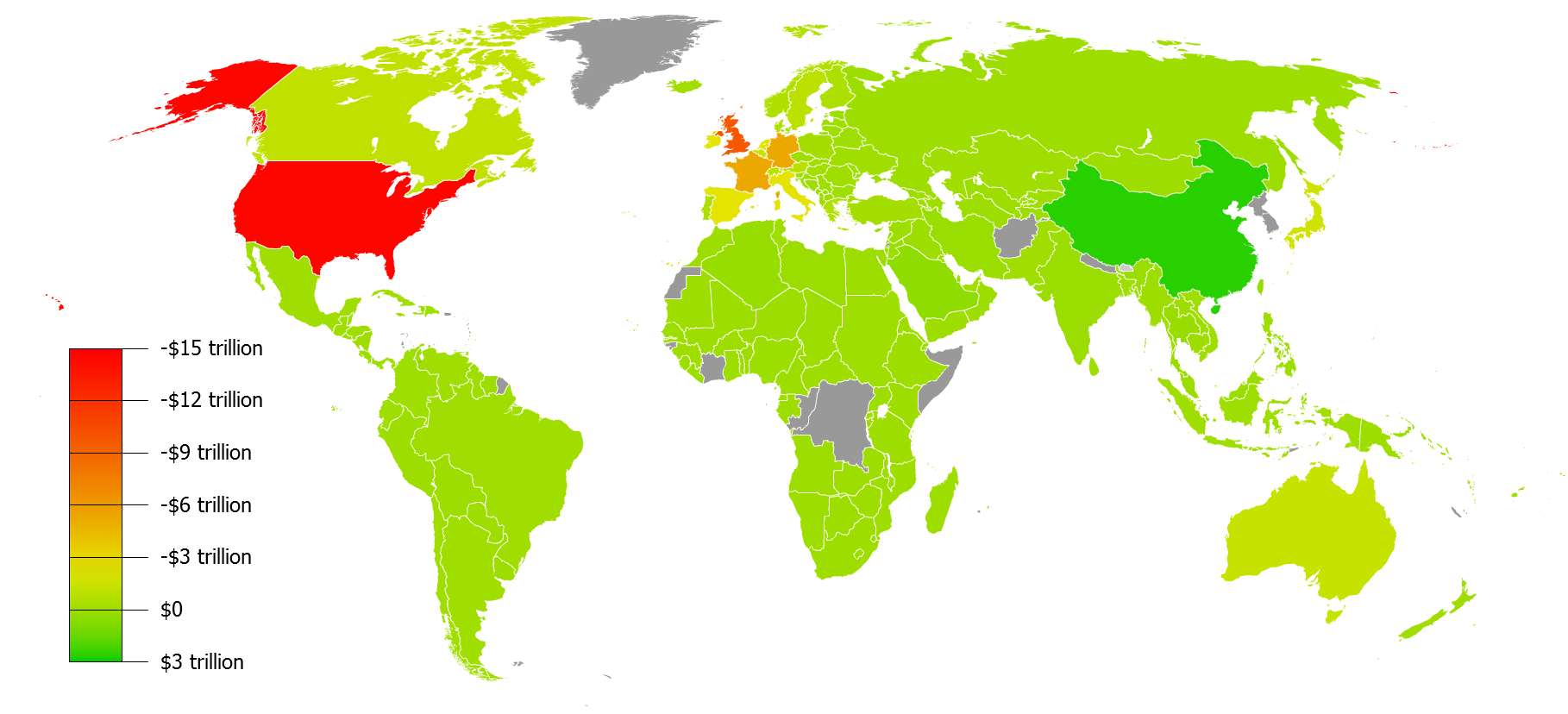
Country foreign exchange reserves minus external debt (2011)

In international economics, the balance of payments (also known as balance of international payments and abbreviated BOP or BoP) of a country is the difference between all money flowing into the country in a particular period of time (e.g., a quarter or a year) and the outflow of money to the rest of the world. These financial transactions are made by individuals, firms and government bodies. BoP compares receipts and payments arising out of trade of goods and services as well as international investment.

The balance of payments consists of two primary components: the current account and the capital and financial account. The current account reflects a country's net income, while the financial account reflects the net change in ownership of national assets. The capital account reflects a part that has little effect on the total, and represents the sum of unilateral capital account transfers, and the acquisitions and sales of non-financial and non-produced assets.

== History ==
Until the early 19th century, international trade was heavily regulated and accounted for a relatively small portion compared with national output. In the Middle Ages, European trade was typically regulated at municipal level in the interests of security for local industry and for established merchants. (Annual fairs would sometimes allow exceptions to the standard regulations.)

=== Mercantilism ===
Beginning in the 16th century, mercantilism became the dominant economic theory influencing European rulers. Local trade regulations were replaced by national rules aiming to harness the economic output of each country. Measures to promote a trade surplus (such as tariffs) were generally favored.

The prevailing orthodoxy of the mercantilist age was the (now discredited) notion that the accumulation of foreign exchange or, at that time, precious metals, made countries wealthier, and so countries favored exporting their own goods to run balance of payments surpluses. This viewpoint prevails in England's Treasure by Foreign Trade (1664) by Thomas Mun.

Economic growth remained at low levels in the mercantilist era; average global per capita income is not considered to have significantly risen in the whole 800 years leading up to 1820, and is estimated to have increased on average by less than 0.1% per year between 1700 and 1820. With very low levels of financial integration between nations and with international trade generally making up a low proportion of individual nations' GDP, BOP crises were very rare.

=== 1820–1914: Classical economics ===
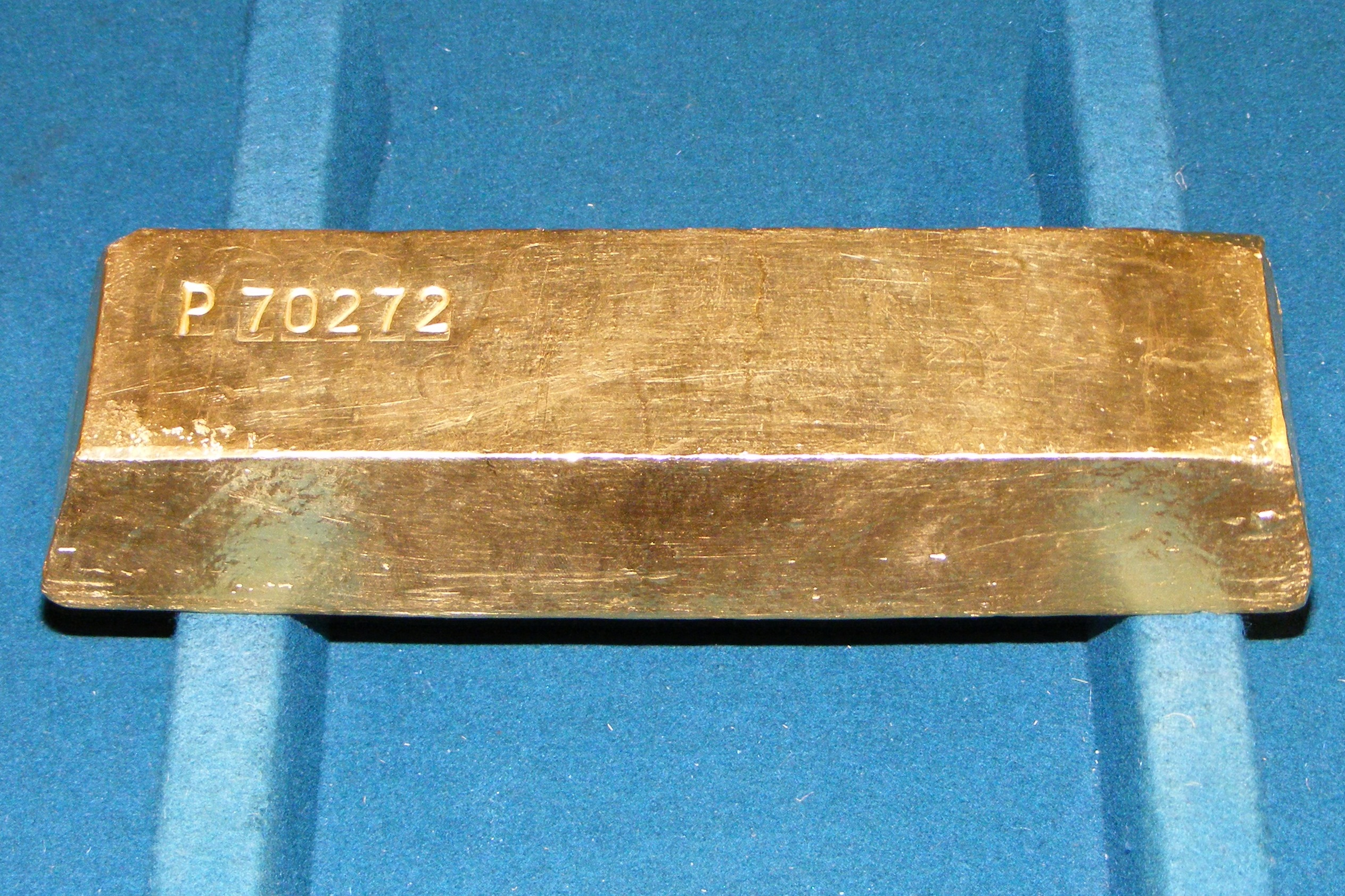
Gold was the primary reserve asset during the gold standard era.

The mercantilist dogma was attacked first by David Hume, then Adam Smith and David Ricardo.

In his 1752 essays Of Money and Of the Balance of Trade, Hume argued that the accumulation of precious metals would create monetary inflation without any real effect on interest rates. It is the foundation of what is known in modern economic studies as the quantity theory of money, the neutrality of money and the consideration of interest rates not as a monetary phenomenon, but a real one. Adam Smith built on this foundation. He accused mercantilists of being anti-free trade and confusing money with wealth.

David Ricardo based his arguments on Say's law, developing the theory of comparative advantage, which remains the dominant theory of growth and trade in modern economics.

After victory in the Napoleonic Wars Great Britain began promoting free trade, unilaterally reducing its trade tariffs. Hoarding of gold was no longer encouraged, and in fact Britain exported more capital as a percentage of its national income than any other creditor nation has since. Great Britain's capital exports further helped to correct global imbalances as they tended to be counter cyclical, rising when Britain's economy went into recession, thus compensating other states for income lost from export of goods.

According to historian Carroll Quigley, Great Britain could afford to act benevolently in the 19th century due to the advantages of her geographical location, naval power, and economic ascendancy as the first nation to enjoy an Industrial Revolution. However, some, like Otto von Bismarck, viewed Great Britain's promotion of free trade as a way to maintain its dominant position. A view advanced by economists such as Barry Eichengreen is that the first age of Globalization began with the laying of transatlantic telegraph cables in the 1860s, which facilitated a rapid increase in the already growing trade between Britain and America.

Though Current Account controls were still widely used (in fact all industrial nations apart from Great Britain and the Netherlands actually increased their tariffs and quotas in the decades leading up to 1914, though this was motivated more by a desire to protect "infant industries" than to encourage a trade surplus), capital controls were largely absent. A gold standard enjoyed wide international participation especially from 1870, further contributing to close economic integration between nations. The period saw substantial global growth, in particular for the volume of international trade which grew tenfold between 1820 and 1870 and then by about 4% annually from 1870 to 1914. BoP crises began to occur, though less frequently than was to be the case for the remainder of the 20th century. From 1880 to 1914, there were approximately eight BoP crises and eight twin crises – a twin crisis being a BoP crisis that coincides with a banking crisis.

=== 1914–1945: Deglobalization ===
The favorable economic conditions that had prevailed up until 1914 were shattered by the first world war, and efforts to re-establish them in the 1920s were not successful. Several countries rejoined the gold standard around 1925. But surplus countries didn't "play by the rules", sterilising gold inflows to a much greater degree than had been the case in the pre-war period. Deficit nations such as Great Britain found it harder to adjust by deflation as workers were more enfranchised and unions in particular were able to resist downwards pressure on wages. During the Great Depression most countries abandoned the gold standard, but imbalances remained an issue and international trade declined sharply. There was a return to mercantilist type "beggar thy neighbour" policies, with countries competitively devaluing their exchange rates, thus effectively competing to export unemployment. There were approximately 16 BoP crises and 15 twin crises (and a comparatively very high level of banking crises).

=== 1945–1971: Bretton Woods ===
Following World War II, the Bretton Woods institutions (the International Monetary Fund and World Bank) were set up to support an international monetary system, among capitalist economies, designed to encourage free trade while also offering states options to correct imbalances without having to deflate their economies. Fixed but flexible exchange rates were established, with the system anchored by the US dollar which alone remained convertible into gold. The Bretton Woods system ushered in a period of high global growth, known as the Golden Age of Capitalism. However, it came under pressure due to the inability or unwillingness of governments to maintain effective capital controls and due to instabilities related to the central role of the US dollar.

Imbalances caused gold to flow out of the US and a loss of confidence in the United States' ability to supply gold for all future claims by US dollar holders resulted in escalating demands to convert US dollars, ultimately causing the US to end the convertibility of the US dollar into gold, thus ending the Bretton Woods system. The 1945–71 era saw approximately 24 BoP crises and no twin crisis for advanced economies, with emerging economies seeing 16 BoP crises and just one twin crisis.

=== 1971–2009: Transition, Washington Consensus, Bretton Woods II ===
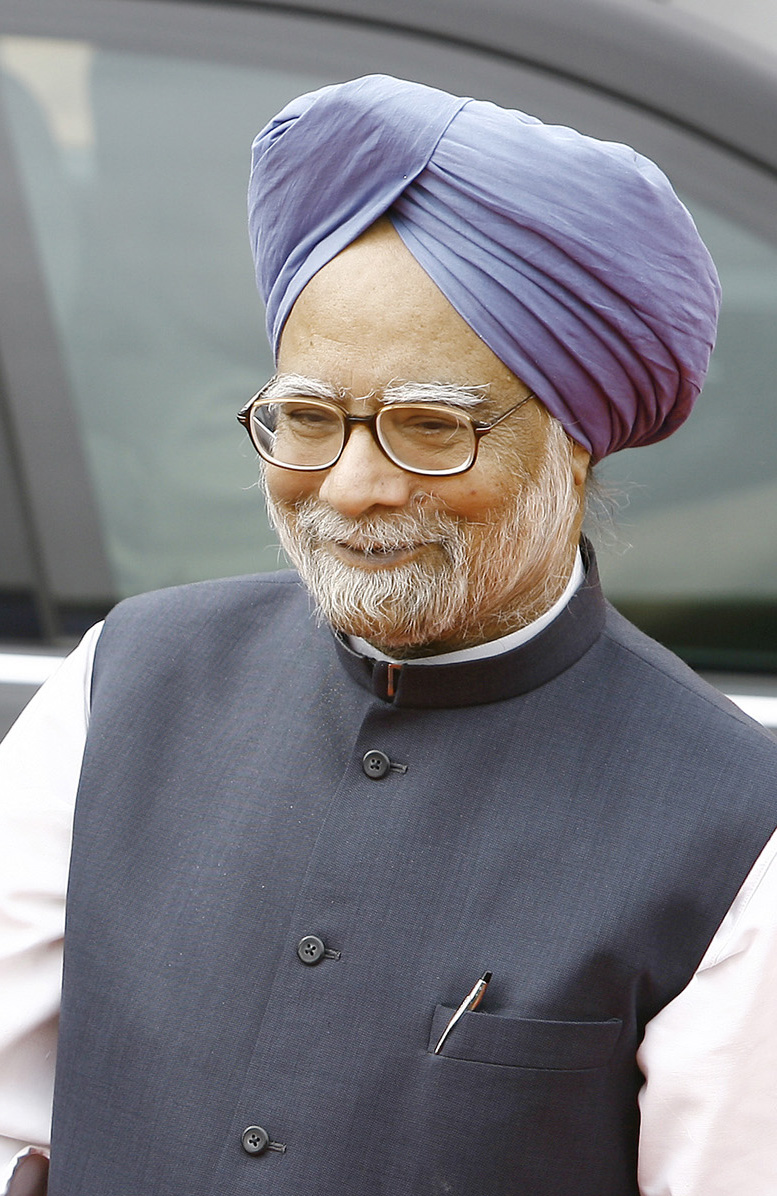
Manmohan Singh, former PM of India (2004–2014), showed that the challenges caused by imbalances can be an opportunity when he led his country's successful economic reform programme after the 1991 crisis, as the minister of Finance.

The Bretton Woods system came to an end between 1971 and 1973. There were attempts to repair the system of fixed exchanged rates over the next few years, but these were soon abandoned, as were determined efforts for the U.S. to avoid BoP imbalances. Part of the reason was displacement of the previous dominant economic paradigm – Keynesianism – by the Washington Consensus, with economists and economics writers such as Murray Rothbard and Milton Friedman arguing that there was no great need to be concerned about BoP issues.

In the immediate aftermath of the Bretton Woods collapse, countries generally tried to retain some control over their exchange rate by independently managing it, or by intervening in the foreign exchange market as part of a regional bloc, such as the Snake which formed in 1971. The Snake was a group of European countries who tried to retain stable rates at least with each other; the group eventually evolved into the European Exchange Rate Mechanism (ERM) by 1979. From the mid-1970s however, and especially in the 1980s and early 1990s, many other countries followed the US in liberalizing controls on both their capital and current accounts, in adopting a somewhat relaxed attitude to their balance of payments and in allowing the value of their currency to float relatively freely with exchange rates determined mostly by the market.

Developing countries who chose to allow the market to determine their exchange rates would often develop sizable current account deficits, financed by capital account inflows such as loans and investments, though this often ended in crises when investors lost confidence. The frequency of crises was especially high for developing economies in this era – from 1973 to 1997 emerging economies suffered 57 BoP crises and 21 twin crises. Typically but not always the panic among foreign creditors and investors that preceded the crises in this period was triggered by concerns over excess borrowing by the private sector, rather than by a government deficit. For advanced economies, there were 30 BoP crises and 6 banking crises.

A turning point was the 1997 Asian financial crisis, where unsympathetic responses by western powers caused policy makers in emerging economies to re-assess the wisdom of relying on the free market; by 1999 the developing world as a whole stopped running current account deficits while the U.S. current account deficit began to rise sharply. This new form of imbalance began to develop in part due to the increasing practice of emerging economies, principally China, in pegging their currency against the dollar, rather than allowing the value to freely float. The resulting state of affairs has been referred to as Bretton Woods II. According to Alaistair Chan, "At the heart of the imbalance is China's desire to keep the value of the yuan stable against the dollar. Usually, a rising trade surplus leads to a rising value of the currency. A rising currency would make exports more expensive, imports less so, and push the trade surplus towards balance. China circumvents the process by intervening in exchange markets and keeping the value of the yuan depressed." According to economics writer Martin Wolf, in the eight years leading up to 2007, "three-quarters of the foreign currency reserves accumulated since the beginning of time have been piled up". In contrast to the changed approach within the emerging economies, US policy makers and economists remained relatively unconcerned about BOP imbalances. In the early to mid-1990s, many free market economists and policy makers such as U.S. Treasury secretary Paul O'Neill and Fed Chairman Alan Greenspan went on record suggesting the growing US deficit was not a major concern. While several emerging economies had intervened to boost their reserves and assist their exporters from the late 1980s, they only began running a net current account surplus after 1999. This was mirrored in the faster growth for the US current account deficit from the same year, with surpluses, deficits and the associated buildup of reserves by the surplus countries reaching record levels by the early 2000s and growing year by year. Some economists such as Kenneth Rogoff and Maurice Obstfeld began warning that the record imbalances would soon need to be addressed from as early as 2001, but it was not until about 2007 that their concerns began to be accepted by the majority of economists.

== Exchange rate regime ==
Under a fixed exchange rate system, a central bank accommodates those flows by buying up any net inflow of funds into the country or by providing foreign currency funds to the foreign exchange market to match any international outflow of funds, thus preventing the funds flows from affecting the exchange rate between the country's currency and other currencies. Then the net change per year in the central bank's foreign exchange reserves is sometimes called the balance of payments surplus or deficit. Alternatives to a fixed exchange rate system include a managed float where some changes of exchange rates are allowed, or at the other extreme a purely floating exchange rate (also known as a purely flexible exchange rate). With a pure float the central bank does not intervene at all to protect or devalue its currency, allowing the rate to be set by the market, the central bank's foreign exchange reserves do not change, and the balance of payments is always zero.

== Components ==
The current account shows the net amount of a country's income if it is in surplus, or spending if it is in deficit. It is the sum of the balance of trade (net earnings on exports minus payments for imports), factor income (earnings on foreign investments minus payments made to foreign investors) and unilateral transfers. These items include transfers of goods and services or financial assets between the home country and the rest of the world. Private transfer payments refer to gifts made by individuals and nongovernmental institutions to foreigners. Governmental transfers refer to gifts or grants made by one government to foreign residents or foreign governments. When investment income and unilateral transfers are combined with the balance on goods and services, we arrive at the current account balance. It is called the current account as it covers transactions in the "here and now" – those that don't give rise to future claims. The capital account records the net change in ownership of foreign assets. It includes the reserve account (the foreign exchange market operations of a nation's central bank), along with loans and investments between the country and the rest of world (but not the future interest payments and dividends that the loans and investments yield; those are earnings and will be recorded in the current account). If a country purchases more foreign assets for cash than the assets it sells for cash to other countries, the capital account is said to be negative or in deficit.

The term "capital account" is also used in the narrower sense that excludes central bank foreign exchange market operations: Sometimes the reserve account is classified as "below the line" and so not reported as part of the capital account.

Expressed with the broader meaning for the capital account, the BoP identity states that any current account surplus will be balanced by a capital account deficit of equal size – or alternatively a current account deficit will be balanced by a corresponding capital account surplus:

$$\text{current account} + \text{ broadly defined capital account}  +  \text{balancing item} = 0. \,$$

The balancing item, which may be positive or negative, is simply an amount that accounts for any statistical errors and assures that the current and capital accounts sum to zero. By the principles of double entry accounting, an entry in the current account gives rise to an entry in the capital account, and in aggregate the two accounts automatically balance. A balance isn't always reflected in reported figures for the current and capital accounts, which might, for example, report a surplus for both accounts, but when this happens it always means something has been missed – most commonly, the operations of the country's central bank – and what has been missed is recorded in the statistical discrepancy term (the balancing item).

An actual balance sheet will typically have numerous sub headings under the principal divisions. For example, entries under the current account might include:

- Trade – buying and selling of goods and services
  - Exports – a credit entry
  - Imports – a debit entry
    - Trade balance – the sum of Exports and Imports
- Factor income – repayments and dividends from loans and investments
  - Factor earnings – a credit entry
  - Factor payments – a debit entry
    - Factor income balance – the sum of earnings and payments.

Especially in older balance sheets, a common division was between visible and invisible entries. Visible trade recorded imports and exports of physical goods (entries for trade in physical goods excluding services is now often called the merchandise balance). Invisible trade would record international buying and selling of services, and sometimes would be grouped with transfer and factor income as invisible earnings.

The term "balance of payments surplus" (or deficit – a deficit is simply a negative surplus) refers to the sum of the surpluses in the current account and the narrowly defined capital account (excluding changes in central bank reserves). Denoting the balance of payments surplus as BoP surplus, the relevant identity is

$$\text{BOP surplus} = \text{current account surplus}  +  \text{narrowly defined capital account surplus}. \,$$

=== Measurements and definitions ===
The balance of payments takes into account payments for a country's exports and imports of goods, services, financial capital, and financial transfers. It is prepared in a single currency, typically the domestic currency for the country concerned. The balance of payments accounts keep systematic records of all the economic transactions (visible and non-visible) of a country with all other countries in the given time period. In the BoP accounts, all the receipts from abroad are recorded as credit and all the payments to abroad are debits. Since the accounts are maintained by double entry bookkeeping, they show the balance of payments accounts are always balanced. Sources of funds for a nation, such as exports or the receipts of loans and investments, are recorded as positive or surplus items. Uses of funds, such as for imports or to invest in foreign countries, are recorded as negative or deficit items.

When all components of the BoP accounts are included they must sum to zero with no overall surplus or deficit. For example, if a country is importing more than it exports, its trade balance will be in deficit, but the shortfall will have to be counterbalanced in other ways – such as by funds earned from its foreign investments (but not the investments themselves, since foreign investments are deficit items), by running down currency reserves or by receiving investments or loans from other countries.

While the overall BoP accounts will always balance when all types of payments are included, imbalances are possible on individual elements of the BoP, such as the current account, the capital account excluding the central bank's reserve account, or the sum of the two. Imbalances in the latter sum can result in surplus countries accumulating wealth, while deficit nations become increasingly indebted. The term "balance of payments" often refers to this sum: a country's balance of payments is said to be in surplus (equivalently, the balance of payments is positive) by a specific amount if sources of funds (such as export goods sold and bonds sold) exceed uses of funds (such as paying for imported goods and paying for foreign bonds purchased) by that amount. There is said to be a balance of payments deficit (the balance of payments is said to be negative) if the former are less than the latter. A BoP surplus (or deficit) is accompanied by an accumulation (or decumulation) of foreign exchange reserves by the central bank.

=== Variations in the use of term balance of payments ===
Economics writer J. Orlin Grabbe warns the term balance of payments can be a source of misunderstanding due to divergent expectations about what the term denotes. Grabbe says the term is sometimes misused by people who aren't aware of the accepted meaning, not only in general conversation but in financial publications and the economic literature.

A common source of confusion arises from whether or not the reserve account entry, part of the capital account, is included in the BoP accounts. The reserve account records the activity of the nation's central bank. If it is excluded, the BoP can be in surplus (which implies the central bank is building up foreign exchange reserves) or in deficit (which implies the central bank is running down its reserves or borrowing from abroad).

The term "balance of payments" is sometimes misused by non-economists to mean just relatively narrow parts of the BoP such as the trade deficit, which means excluding parts of the current account and the entire capital account.

Another cause of confusion is the different naming conventions in use. Before 1973 there was no standard way to break down the BoP sheet, with the separation into invisible and visible payments sometimes being the principal divisions. The IMF have their own standards for BoP accounting which is equivalent to the standard definition but uses different nomenclature, in particular with respect to the meaning given to the term capital account.

=== The IMF definition of the Balance of Payments ===
The International Monetary Fund (IMF) use a particular set of definitions for the BoP accounts, which is also used by the Organisation for Economic Co-operation and Development (OECD), and the United Nations System of National Accounts (SNA).

The main difference in the IMF's terminology is that it uses the term "financial account" to capture transactions that would under alternative definitions be recorded in the capital account. The IMF uses the term capital account to designate a subset of transactions that, according to other usage, previously formed a small part of the overall current account. The IMF separates these transactions out to form an additional top level division of the BoP accounts. Expressed with the IMF definition, the BoP identity can be written:

$$\text{current account} \, +  \, \text{financial account}\,  + \,  \text{capital account} \, + \, \text{balancing item} \, = \, 0. \,$$

The IMF uses the term current account with the same meaning as that used by other organizations, although it has its own names for its three leading sub-divisions, which are:

- The goods and services account – the overall trade balance
- The primary income account – factor income such as from loans and investments
- The secondary income account – transfer payments

== Uses ==
The balance of payments is important in international financial management for the following reasons:

First, the balance of payments is a factor in the demand and supply of a country's currency. For example, if outflows exceed inflows, then the demand for the currency in the domestic market is likely to exceed the supply in the foreign exchange market, all else being equal. One can thus infer that the currency would be under pressure to depreciate against other currencies. On the other hand, if inflows exceed outflows, then its currency would be likely to appreciate.

Second, a country's balance of payments data may signal the country's potential as a business partner for the rest of the world. A country grappling with a major balance of payments difficulty may not be able to expand imports from the outside world. Instead, the country may impose measures to restrict imports and discourage capital outflows in order to improve the balance of payments situation. On the other hand, a country with a significant balance of payments surplus would be more likely to expand imports, offering marketing opportunities for foreign enterprises, and less likely to impose foreign exchange restrictions.

Third, balance of payments data can be used to evaluate the performance of the country in international economic competition. A country that is experiencing trade deficits year after year may be a signal that the country's domestic industries lack international competitiveness.

== Imbalances ==
While payments in the scheme have to balance overall between two countries, there can be surpluses or deficits in the individual accounts, representing imbalances between the countries. In general there is concern over deficits in the current account. Countries with deficits in their current accounts will build up increasing debt or see increased foreign ownership of their assets. The types of deficits that typically raise concern are

- A visible trade deficit where a nation is importing more physical goods than it exports (even if this is balanced by the other components of the current account.)
- An overall current account deficit.
- A basic deficit which is the current account plus foreign direct investment (but excluding other elements of the capital account like short terms loans and the reserve account.)

The Washington Consensus period saw a swing of opinion towards the view that there is no need to worry about imbalances. Opinion swung back in the opposite direction during the 2008 financial crisis. Mainstream opinion expressed by the leading financial press and economists, international bodies like the IMF – as well as leaders of surplus and deficit countries – has returned to the view that large current account imbalances do matter. Some economists do, however, remain relatively unconcerned about imbalances and there have been assertions, such as by Michael P. Dooley, David Folkerts-Landau and Peter Garber, that nations need to avoid the temptation to switch to protectionism as a means to correct imbalances.

Current account surpluses coincide with current account deficits of other countries, the indebtedness of the latter therefore increasing. According to Balances Mechanics by Wolfgang Stützel this is described as surplus of expenses over revenues. Increasing imbalances in foreign trade are critically discussed as a possible cause of the 2008 financial crisis. Many Keynesian economists consider the existing differences between the current accounts in the eurozone to be the root cause of the euro area crisis, for instance Heiner Flassbeck, Paul Krugman or Joseph Stiglitz.

=== Causes of BoP imbalances ===
There are conflicting views as to the primary cause of BoP imbalances, with much attention on the US which currently has by far the biggest deficit. The conventional view is that current account factors are the primary cause – these include the exchange rate, the government's fiscal deficit, business competitiveness, and private behaviour such as the willingness of consumers to go into debt to finance extra consumption.

An alternative view, argued at length in a 2005 paper by Ben Bernanke, is that the primary driver is the capital account, where a global savings glut caused by savers in surplus countries, runs ahead of the available investment opportunities, and is pushed into the US resulting in excess consumption and asset price inflation.

=== Reserve asset ===
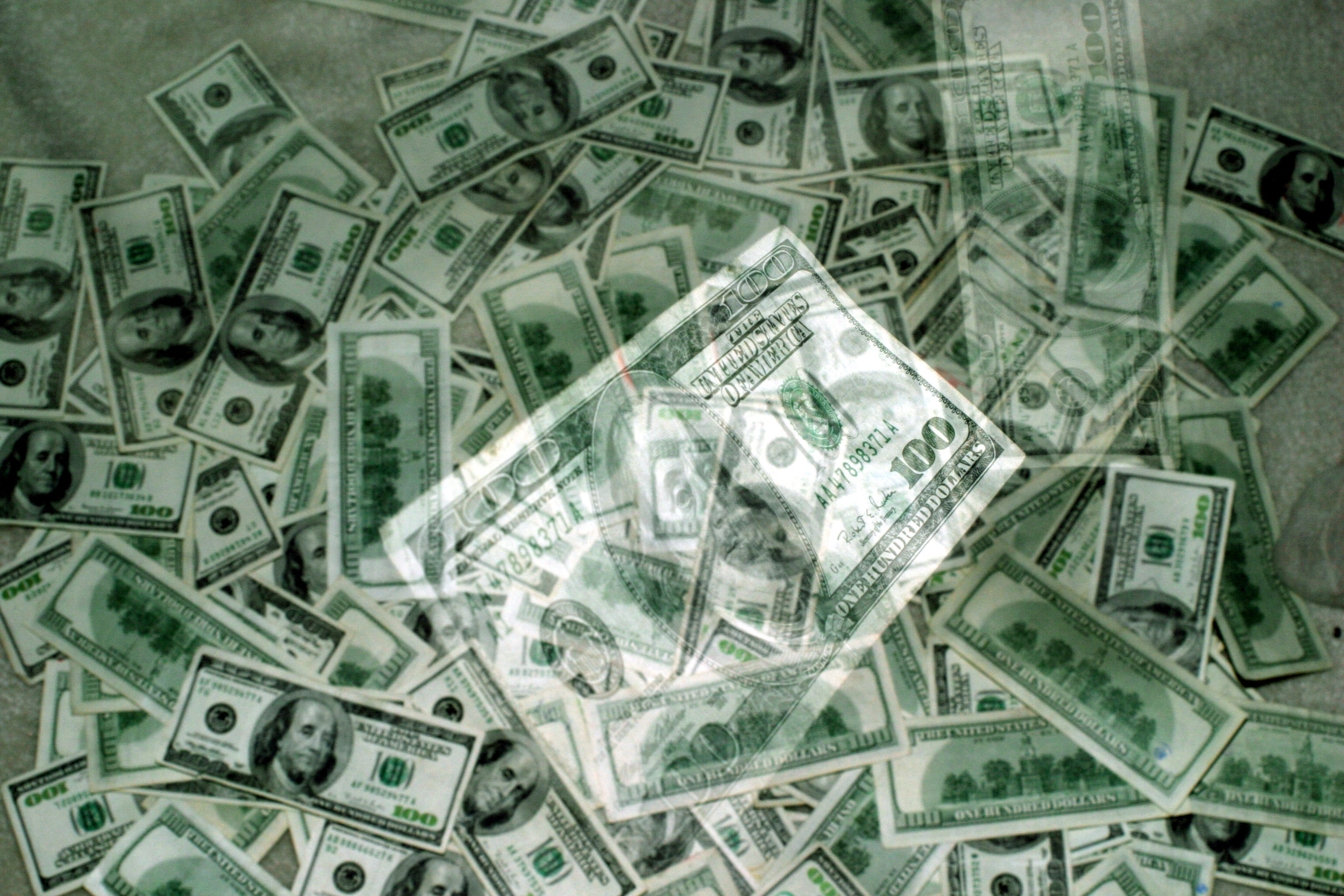
The US dollar has been the leading reserve asset since the end of the gold standard.

In the context of BoP and international monetary systems, the reserve asset is the currency or other store of value that is primarily used by nations for their foreign reserves. BoP imbalances tend to manifest as hoards of the reserve asset being amassed by surplus countries, with deficit countries building debts denominated in the reserve asset or at least depleting their supply. Under a gold standard, the reserve asset for all members of the standard is gold. In the Bretton Woods system, either gold or the U.S. dollar could serve as the reserve asset, though its smooth operation depended on countries apart from the US choosing to keep most of their holdings in dollars.

Following the ending of Bretton Woods, there has been no de jure reserve asset, but the US dollar has remained by far the principal de facto reserve. Global reserves rose sharply in the first decade of the 21st century, partly as a result of the 1997 Asian financial crisis, where several nations ran out of foreign currency needed for essential imports and thus had to accept deals on unfavourable terms. The International Monetary Fund (IMF) estimates that between 2000 and mid-2009, official reserves rose from $1,900bn to $6,800bn.

Global reserves had peaked at about $7,500bn in mid-2008, then declined by about $430bn as countries without their own reserve currency used them to shield themselves from the worst effects of the 2008 financial crisis. From Feb 2009 global reserves began increasing again to reach close to $9,200bn by the end of 2010.

As of 2009, approximately 65% of the world's $6,800bn total is held in U.S. dollars and approximately 25% in euros. The UK pound, Japanese yen, IMF special drawing rights (SDRs), and precious metals also play a role. In 2009, Zhou Xiaochuan, governor of the People's Bank of China, proposed a gradual move towards increased use of SDRs, and also for the national currencies backing SDRs to be expanded to include the currencies of all major economies.

While the current central role of the dollar does give the US some advantages, such as lower cost of borrowings, it also contributes to the pressure causing the U.S. to run a current account deficit, due to the Triffin dilemma. In a November 2009 article published in Foreign Affairs magazine, economist C. Fred Bergsten argued that Zhou's suggestion or a similar change to the international monetary system would be in the best interests of the United States as well as the rest of the world. Since 2009 there has been a notable increase in the number of new bilateral agreements which enable international trades to be transacted using a currency that is not a traditional reserve asset, such as the renminbi, as the settlement currency.

=== Balance of payments crisis ===
A BoP crisis, also called a currency crisis, occurs when a nation is unable to pay for essential imports or service its external debt repayments. Typically, this is accompanied by a rapid decline in the value of the affected nation's currency. Crises are generally preceded by large capital inflows, which are associated at first with rapid economic growth. However a point is reached where overseas investors become concerned about the level of debt their inbound capital is generating, and decide to pull out their funds. It sometimes takes only one or two large investors pulling out to trigger a mass panic due to herd effects. The resulting outbound capital flows are associated with a rapid drop in the value of the affected nation's currency. This causes issues for firms of the affected nation who have received the inbound investments and loans, as the revenue of those firms is typically mostly derived domestically but their debts are often denominated in a reserve currency. Once the nation's government has exhausted its foreign reserves trying to support the value of the domestic currency, its policy options are very limited. It can raise its interest rates to try to prevent further declines in the value of its currency, but while this can help those with debts denominated in foreign currencies, it generally further depresses the local economy. Lower-income countries are more exposed to suffer this type of crisis, while economic growth and foreign-exchange piling are particularly useful to prevent them.

== Balancing mechanisms ==
One of the three fundamental functions of an international monetary system is to provide mechanisms to correct imbalances.

Broadly speaking, there are three possible methods to correct BoP imbalances, though in practice a mixture including some degree of at least the first two methods tends to be used. These methods are adjustments of exchange rates; adjustment of a nations internal prices along with its levels of demand; and rules based adjustment. Improving productivity and hence competitiveness can also help, as can increasing the desirability of exports through other means, though it is generally assumed a nation is always trying to develop and sell its products to the best of its abilities.

=== Rebalancing by changing the exchange rate ===
An upwards shift in the value of a nation's currency relative to others will make a nation's exports less competitive and make imports cheaper and so will tend to correct a current account surplus. It also tends to make investment flows into the capital account less attractive so will help with a surplus there too. Conversely a downward shift in the value of a nation's currency makes it more expensive for its citizens to buy imports and increases the competitiveness of their exports, thus helping to correct a deficit (though the solution often does not have a positive effect immediately due to the Marshall–Lerner condition).

Exchange rates can be adjusted by government in a rules based or managed currency regime, and when left to float freely in the market they also tend to change in the direction that will restore balance. When a country is selling more than it imports, the demand for its currency will tend to increase as other countries ultimately need the selling country's currency to make payments for the exports. The extra demand tends to cause a rise of the currency's price relative to others. When a country is importing more than it exports, the supply of its own currency on the international market tends to increase as it tries to exchange it for foreign currency to pay for its imports, and this extra supply tends to cause the price to fall. BoP effects are not the only market influence on exchange rates however, they are also influenced by differences in national interest rates and by speculation.

=== Rebalancing by adjusting internal prices and demand ===
When exchange rates are fixed by a rigid gold standard, or when imbalances exist between members of a currency union such as the Eurozone, the standard approach to correct imbalances is by making changes to the domestic economy. To a large degree, the change is optional for the surplus country, but compulsory for the deficit country. In the case of a gold standard, the mechanism is largely automatic. When a country has a favourable trade balance, as a consequence of selling more than it buys it will experience a net inflow of gold. The natural effect of this will be to increase the money supply, which leads to inflation and an increase in prices, which then tends to make its goods less competitive and so will decrease its trade surplus. However the nation has the option of taking the gold out of economy (sterilising the inflationary effect) thus building up a hoard of gold and retaining its favourable balance of payments. On the other hand, if a country has an adverse BoP it will experience a net loss of gold, which will automatically have a deflationary effect, unless it chooses to leave the gold standard. Prices will be reduced, making its exports more competitive, and thus correcting the imbalance. While the gold standard is generally considered to have been successful up until 1914, correction by deflation to the degree required by the large imbalances that arose after WWI proved painful, with deflationary policies contributing to prolonged unemployment but not re-establishing balance. Apart from the US most former members had left the gold standard by the mid-1930s.

A possible method for surplus countries such as Germany to contribute to re-balancing efforts when exchange rate adjustment is not suitable, is to increase its level of internal demand (i.e. its spending on goods). While a current account surplus is commonly understood as the excess of earnings over spending, an alternative expression is that it is the excess of savings over investment.

That is:
$$\text{CA} = \text{NS} - \text{NI}  \,$$
where CA is the current account, NS is the national savings (private plus government sector), and NI is the national investment.

If a nation is earning more than it spends the net effect will be to build up savings, except to the extent that those savings are being used for investment. If consumers can be encouraged to spend more instead of saving; or if the government runs a fiscal deficit to offset private savings; or if the corporate sector divert more of their profits to investment, then any current account surplus will tend to be reduced. However, in 2009 Germany amended its constitution to prohibit running a deficit greater than 0.35% of its GDP and calls to reduce its surplus by increasing demand have not been welcome by officials, adding to fears that the 2010s would not be an easy decade for the eurozone. In their April 2010 world economic outlook report, the IMF presented a study showing how with the right choice of policy options governments can shift away from a sustained current account surplus with no negative effect on growth and with a positive effect on unemployment.

=== Rules based rebalancing mechanisms ===
Nations can agree to fix their exchange rates against each other, and then correct any imbalances that arise by rules based and negotiated exchange rate changes and other methods. The Bretton Woods system of fixed but adjustable exchange rates was an example of a rules based system. John Maynard Keynes, one of the architects of the Bretton Woods system had wanted additional rules to encourage surplus countries to share the burden of rebalancing, as he argued that they were in a stronger position to do so and as he regarded their surpluses as negative externalities imposed on the global economy. Keynes suggested that traditional balancing mechanisms should be supplemented by the threat of confiscation of a portion of excess revenue if the surplus country did not choose to spend it on additional imports. However his ideas were not accepted by the Americans at the time. In 2008 and 2009, American economist Paul Davidson had been promoting his revamped form of Keynes's plan as a possible solution to global imbalances which in his opinion would expand growth all round without the downside risk of other rebalancing methods.

== Post-Washington Consensus developments ==
Speaking after the 2009 G-20 London summit, Gordon Brown announced "the Washington Consensus is over". There is now broad agreement that large imbalances between different countries do matter; for example mainstream U.S. economist C. Fred Bergsten has argued the U.S. deficit and the associated large inbound capital flows into the U.S. was one of the causes of the 2008 financial crisis. Since the crisis, government intervention in BOP areas such as the imposition of capital controls or foreign exchange market intervention has become more common and in general attracts less disapproval from economists, international institutions like the IMF and other governments.

In 2007, when the crises began, the global total of yearly BoP imbalances was $1680 billion. On the credit side, the biggest current account surplus was China with approx. $362 billion, followed by Japan at $213 billion and Germany at £185 billion, with oil producing countries such as Saudi Arabia also having large surpluses. On the debit side, the US had the biggest current account deficit at over $1100 billion, with the UK, Spain and Australia together accounting for close to a further $300 billion.

While there have been warnings of future cuts in public spending, deficit countries on the whole did not make these in 2009, in fact the opposite happened with increased public spending contributing to recovery as part of global efforts to increase demand. The emphases has instead been on the surplus countries, with the IMF, EU and nations such as the U.S., Brazil and Russia asking them to assist with the adjustments to correct the imbalances.

Economists such as Gregor Irwin and Philip R. Lane have suggested that increased use of pooled reserves could help emerging economies not to require such large reserves and thus have less need for current account surpluses.

Writing for the FT in Jan 2009, Gillian Tett says she expects to see policy makers becoming increasingly concerned about exchange rates over the coming year.

In June 2009, Olivier Blanchard the chief economist of the IMF wrote that rebalancing the world economy by reducing both sizeable surpluses and deficits will be a requirement for sustained recovery.

In 2008 and 2009, there was some reduction in imbalances, but early indications towards the end of 2009 were that major imbalances such as the U.S. current account deficit are set to begin increasing again.

Japan had allowed its currency to appreciate through 2009, but has only limited scope to contribute to the rebalancing efforts thanks in part to its aging population. The euro used by Germany is allowed to float fairly freely in value, however further appreciation would be problematic for other members of the currency union such as Spain, Greece and Ireland who run large deficits. Therefore, Germany has instead been asked to contribute by further promoting internal demand, but this hasn't been welcomed by German officials.

China has been requested to allow the renminbi (Chinese Yuan) to appreciate but until 2010 had refused, the position expressed by its premier Wen Jiabao being that by keeping the value of the renmimbi stable against the US dollar China has been helping the global recovery, and that calls to let its currency rise in value have been motivated by a desire to hold back China's development. After China reported favourable results for December 2009 exports however, the Financial Times reported that analysts are optimistic that China will allow some appreciation of its currency around mid-2010.

In April 2010 a Chinese official signalled the government is considering allowing the renminbi to appreciate, but by May analysts were widely reporting the appreciation would likely be delayed due to the falling value of the Euro during the euro area crisis. China announced the end of the renminbi's peg to the US dollar in June 2010; the move was widely welcomed by markets and helped defuse tension over imbalances prior to the 2010 G-20 Toronto summit. However the renminbi remains managed and the new flexibility means it can move down as well as up in value; two months after the peg ended the renminbi had only appreciated against the US dollar by about 0.8%.

By January 2011, the renminbi had appreciated against the US dollar by 3.7%, which means it's on track to appreciate in nominal terms by 6% per year. As this reflects a real appreciation of 10% when China's higher inflation is accounted for, the U.S. Treasury once again declined to label China a currency manipulator in their February 2011 report to Congress. However, Treasury officials did advise that the rate of appreciation was still too slow for the best interests of the global economy.

In February 2011, Moody's analyst Alaistair Chan has predicted that despite a strong case for an upward revaluation, an increased rate of appreciation against the US dollar is unlikely in the short term. And as of February 2012, China's currency had been continuing to appreciate for a year and a half, while drawing remarkably little notice.

While some leading surplus countries including China have been taking steps to boost domestic demand, these have not yet been sufficient to rebalance out of their current account surpluses. By June 2010, the U.S. monthly current account deficit had risen back to $50 billion, a level not seen since mid-2008. With the US currently suffering from high unemployment and concerned about taking on additional debt, fears are rising that the US may resort to protectionist measures.

=== Competitive devaluation after 2009 ===
By September 2010, international tensions relating to imbalances had further increased. Brazil's finance minister Guido Mantega declared that an "international currency war" has broken out, with countries competitively trying to devalue their currency so as to boost exports. Brazil has been one of the few major economies lacking a reserve currency to abstain from significant currency intervention, with the real rising by 25% against the US dollar since January 2009. Some economists such as Barry Eichengreen have argued that competitive devaluation may be a good thing as the net result will effectively be equivalent to expansionary global monetary policy. Others such as Martin Wolf saw risks of tensions further escalating and advocated that coordinated action for addressing imbalances should be agreed on at the November G20 summit.

Commentators largely agreed that little substantive progress was made on imbalances at the November 2010 G20. An IMF report released after the summit warned that without additional progress there is a risk of imbalances approximately doubling to reach pre-crises levels by 2014.

== Economic policy and the balance of payment ==
Balance of payments and international headcount data is critical to the formulation of national and international economic policies. The balance of payments imbalances and foreign direct investment (FDI) is crucial for a country's policymakers to seek solutions. The effects of national and international policies can be seen in the balance of payments data. For example, one country may implement a policy to attract foreign investment. In contrast, another country may want to keep its currency relatively low to stimulate exports. Although a country's balance of payments will bring its current account and capital account into balance, there will be imbalances between countries' accounts. According to the World Bank data, the current account deficit in the United States is $498 billion in 2019 (The World Bank)

Suppose a country's balance of payments deficits are persistent. In that case, the country may suffer from a loss of confidence as its foreign exchange reserves deplete. At the same time, it makes the country very vulnerable to seasonal, cyclical or unpredictable fluctuations in foreign countries. It could lead to excessive inflation at home. Therefore, the stability of currency provides a strong guarantee for the sustainable development of the economy. Countries can analyze the current economic situation domestically and internationally through the annual balance of payment and formulate effective monetary policy combined with the political influence of international and multilateral relations (Zolotas and Ethymiou 1965)

The economic policy objectives could, in principle, serve as the standard for the balance of payments policies. At the same time, exchange rate policy is treated as income policy. F. De Roos (1982) argues that only equilibrium of the balance of payments can be considered as a long term criterion for the balance of payments policy in the case of stable exchange rates. In the case of flexible exchange rates, the criterion can be found in the degree of domestic economic stability.

== IMF Balance of Payments Manual ==
The Balance of Payments Manual published by the International Monetary Fund provides accounting standards for balance of payments reporting and analysis for many countries. The United States Bureau of Economic Analysis adheres to this standard.

Since the fifth edition from 1993, the revision are done jointy with the revision of the System of national accounts, this enable a high compatibility with the concept used in both system as the balance of payments is often used a source of compiling the national accounts.

The sixth edition was released in prepublication form in December 2008. Its title was amended to Balance of Payments and International Investment Position Manual to reflect that it covers not only transactions, but also the stocks of the related financial assets and liabilities.

Together with the manual IMF has published an accompanying document Balance of Payments and International Investment Position Compilation Guide providing practical advice on the topics of the manual.

== See also ==
- Commercial policy
- Currency crisis
- Exchange rate regime
- Foreign exchange reserves
- History of money
- IMF Balance of Payments Manual
- Sectoral balances
- Sovereign default
- Sterilization (economics)
- Sudden stop (economics)
