= Let Catalans Vote =

International support manifesto to the Catalan independence referendum

Let Catalans Vote (in Catalan: Deixin votar els catalans) is an international support manifesto to the Catalan independence referendum.

The manifesto points out that the best way to solve legitimate internal disputes is to employ the tools of democracy and calls on the Spanish Government and its institutions, and their Catalan counterparts, to work together to allow the citizens of Catalonia to vote on their political future and then negotiate in good faith based on the result. The manifesto declares that the fact to prevent the Catalans from voting seems to contradict the principles that inspire democratic societies.

The manifesto has been signed by several personalities of international relevance, which include the following five Nobel Prize winners: Rigoberta Menchú, Desmond Tutu, Adolfo Pérez Esquivel, Dario Fo and Jody Williams.

== Signers ==
The signers of the manifesto come from different professional and labour fields. In the field of art and culture: Joan Baez, Mārtiņš Brauns, Andrea Camilleri, Dario Fo, Peter Gabriel, Saúl Hernández, Ken Loach, António Lobo Antunes, Hélder Mateus da Costa, Viggo Mortensen, Yoko Ono Lennon, Silvio Rodríguez, Peter Sís, Colm Tóibín, Pēteris Vasks, Irvine Welsh and Tsering Woeser. In the academic and university field: Zygmunt Bauman, Harold Bloom, Noam Chomsky, Angela Davis, Susan George, Costas Lapavitsas, Adolfo Pérez Esquivel, Paul Preston, Saskia Sassen, Richard Sennett and Hans Ulrich Gumbrecht. In the field of civil and institutional policy: Gerry Adams, Tariq Ali, José Bové, Piedad Córdoba, Heiner Flassbeck, Ahmed Galai, Peter Jambreck, Hu Jia, Wuer Kaixi, Ronald Kasrils, Rigoberta Menchú, Ambler Moss, José Shulman, Jody Williams and Jason Y. Ng. In the field of sport: Eric Cantona, Johan Cruyff and Hristo Stoichkov. Also signed by: Ignacio Ramonet, Bill Shipsey, Bořek Šípek and Desmond Tutu.
