= Hans Gestrich =

German economist

- Born: 17 September 1895; Berlin, German Empire
- Died: 21 November 1943 (aged 48)
- Occupation: Economist
- Known for: Modern credit theory

Hans Gestrich (17 September 1895 – 21 November 1943) was a German ordoliberalist economist and oppositionist for Germany's deflationary policies (deflationspolitik).

== Early life and career ==
Gestrich was born in Berlin, German Empire, on 17 September 1895.

He became press officer for the Reichsbank in 1931. He aligned his beliefs with Swedish economist Knut Wicksell, studying the business cycle theory and implementing it into his career. Gestrich participated in the Secret conference of the Friedrich List Society in September 1931 on the possibilities and consequences of expanding credit.

He assumed the position of economic advisor for the Prussian State Bank and held it until his death in 1943.

== Works ==
Gestrich is credited as a researcher of the German modern credit theory. He worked alongside Wilhelm Lautenbach, Otto Pfleiderer, Leonhard Gleske, and Wolfgang Stützel.

=== Neue Kreditpolitik, 1936 ===
His book Neue Kreditpolitik discusses credit mechanics and the workings of the modern banking system, specifically how it's adapted for the European continent. The book analyzes how banks create money through credit expansion and contraction. He uses balance sheet diagrams to showcase these booking processes.

=== Kredit und Sparen, 1944 ===
Gestrich criticises the loanable funds theory, which posits that saving is a prerequisite for credit provision. He argues that credit supply is not limited by the amount of saving, instead depending on banks' ability and willingness to provide loans and borrowers' willingness to incur debt.
