= Heiner Flassbeck =

German economist and public intellectual

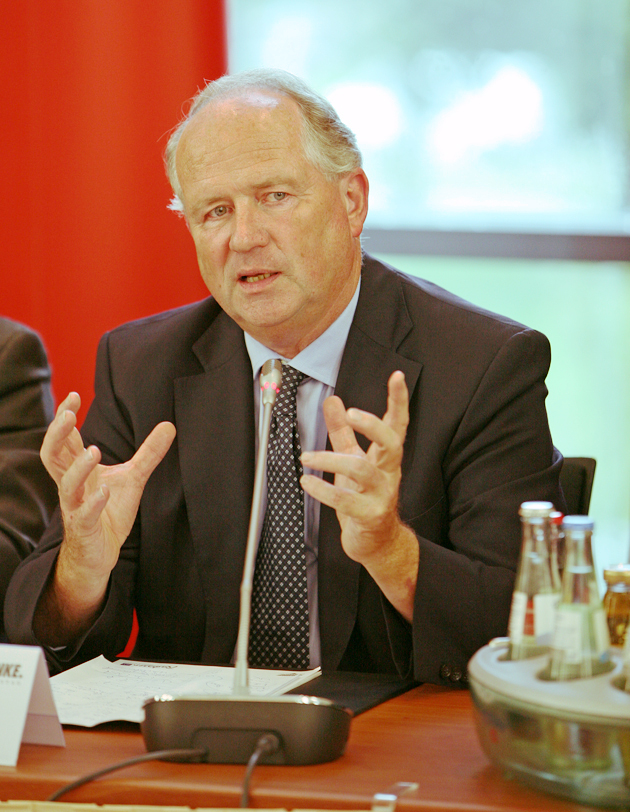
- Flassbeck in 2011
- Born: 12 December 1950 (age 75); Birkenfeld, West Germany

Academic background
- Influences: John Maynard Keynes, Joseph Schumpeter, Wolfgang Stützel

Academic work
- Discipline: Economics, Macroeconomics, Monetary economics, International economics, Economic policy
- School or tradition: Keynesian economics
- Institutions: Saarland University 1971–76 German Council of Economic Experts Assistants Staff 1977–80 German Federal Ministry for Economy and Technology 1980–85 Free University of Berlin 1981–87 German Institute for Economic Research 1986–98 Federal Ministry of Finance (Germany) 1998–99 United Nations Conference on Trade and Development (UNCTAD) 2000–13
- Notable ideas: Trade theory, Foreign trade theory, Economic crisis, Monetary system, Monetary policy, Wage policy
- Awards: Honorary Professor Hamburg University

Heiner Flassbeck (born 12 December 1950) is a German economist and public intellectual. From 1998 to 1999 he was a State Secretary in the German Federal Ministry of Finance (German: Bundesministerium der Finanzen) where he also advised former finance minister Oskar Lafontaine on a reform of the European Monetary System. He became the Chief of Macroeconomics and Development of the United Nations Conference on Trade and Development (UNCTAD) in Geneva in January 2003, a position that he held until resigning at the end of 2012 due to his age.

== Life ==
Heiner Flassbeck studied economics at Saarland University (1971–1976). During that time he was assistant at chair of Wolfgang Stützel with emphasis on currency issues. Afterwards, up to 1980 he worked in the assistants staff of the German Council of Economic Experts. 1987 he received a doctors degree Dr. rer. pol. at the Free University of Berlin with his work: Prices, Interest and Currency Rate. On Theory of Open Economy at flexible Exchange Rates (German: Preise, Zins und Wechselkurs. Zur Theorie der offenen Volkswirtschaft bei flexiblen Wechselkursen).

After he was operating at the Federal Ministry for Economy and Technology since 1980, he changed over to the German Institute for Economic Research (German: Deutsches Institut für Wirtschaftsforschung, DIW) in Berlin in 1986, where he worked on labour market- and business cycle analysis and concepts of economic policy. 1990 he became head of the department business cycle at the institute.

When the government changed in October 1998 he was appointed State Secretary in the Ministry of Finance in the first Schröder cabinet. He counseled the former finance minister Oskar Lafontaine with his intent to establish together with French finance minister Dominique Strauss-Kahn a Keynesian fiscal policy and monetary policy on level of the European Union and to reform the international monetary system. After Oskar Lafontaine resigned from minister in March 1999, Flassbeck's work as a state secretary ended in April 1999 as well.

That followed a period of working free lance as an economic researcher and a publicist. From November 2000 to December 2002 he worked as a senior economist at the United Nations Conference on Trade and Development (UNCTAD). From January 2003 up to his service retirement he was the chief economist, Chief of Macroeconomics and Development of the UNCTAD, since August 2003 Director of Division on Globalization and Development Strategies.

The Hamburg University of Economics and Politics appointed Flassbeck an honorary professor in March 2005.

== Positions on economic policy ==
In his early scientific career, in the 1980s, Flassbeck in particular dealt with questions of foreign trade theory (an area of International economics) and monetary policy. In his work Free trade, GATT and the international currency system (German: Freihandel, GATT und das internationale Währungssystem. 1985) he offered an essay to redefine the benefits of free trade based on a new trade theory. In frame of a system of flexible currency rates a decision between protectionism and free trade could not be made and in addition the targeted national autonomy in monetary policy not be achieved. In his dissertation from 1988, Prices, Interest and Currency Rate, he spoke for "absolutely fixed currency rates" as only solution that could ensure an efficient and continuous adjustment of global economy and outer price stability. According to Flassbeck, the effects by revaluation and devaluation at flexible currency rates were equal to state interference at its discretion and as much exogenous as non-market driven changes in currency rate.

Flassbeck explained his positions on economic policy together with economist Frederike Spiecker in their book The End of Mass Unemployment (German: Das Ende der Massenarbeitslosigkeit, 2007). He does not consider the reasons for the weak growth and mass unemployment of many years in Germany as a result of technological progress, globalization or too high wages, but as a consequence of a not demand-orientated policy. Flassbeck since then instead advocates an economic policy which follows basic Keynesian principles and claims a "reform of thinking". After the first worsening of the financial crisis since 2007 he published his book: Failed. Why politics surrenders to economy (German: Gescheitert. Warum die Politik vor der Wirtschaft kapituliert. March 2009). There he particularly highlights the omissions made by German economics policy during the German reunification and its recurrence at the European monetary union. He put the economic crisis down to a structure-conservative policy which focused on individual economic (microeconomic) particular interests, with what the market economy in the end was questioned.

In September 2010 Flassbecks book The Market Economy of the 21st Century (German: Die Marktwirtschaft des 21. Jahrhunderts) was released: shocks and crisis were the normality in a market economy system, periods of stability the exceptional case. It needed an international monetary system like it already rudimentarily had existed in the early postwar period with the Bretton Woods system. In the new market economy of the 21st century, for every problem solutions should open-ended be searched for, which either could be borne by market or by state. Interests, exchange rates and prices for natural resources would clearly belong to state price control on international level. Already in a system of decontrolled financial markets as existent since beginning of the 1980s, the price formation by way of supply and demand was suspended — so that a market in the classical meaning had not been existent there.

Flassbecks latest publication, the Ten Myths of Crisis (German: Zehn Mythen der Krise. 2012), predominantly contains a political evaluation of the finance- and eurozone crisis, as well as the estimation that the economic "Aufklärung" could be achieved not until a future expectable new crisis happens.

=== Saving and investment ===
Flassbeck assigns a major role to the insight that a national economy cannot save: the common understanding that a national economy could gain net savings, thus saving money during a certain period of time to finance investment in a future period using saved money, was false. This thinking by Flassbeck follows the results of Balances Mechanics developed by German economist Wolfgang Stützel. Saving of one economic unit currently inevitably led to revenue loss of another unit. At present somebody in the economy was stuck with his supply. Expenses which are not done would fall away in same height. Because the sum of revenues, with that the incomes, of all economic units equals the sum of all expenses and with that the overall demand of all economic units, incomes would decline in future. The income generated in one period was to be used "always". By analogy with "time saving", which cannot be saved, saving in terms of not-using could not exist in an economy. Today's investments were the condition to build up assets, not invers. Both quantities were equal solely in an ex-post examination.

From the people's and economic politicians' ignorance about the difference between the overall economic and the individual economic unit view, according to Flassbeck, many fallacies of today's economics can be analysed. For example, national debt was falsely seen as debts towards future generations, but in fact the welfare of a country was determined solely by its future capital stock, thus mainly by the existing machines and facilities plus the standing of qualification of its population and the social capital (which enclosures the stability of the society's constitution). On macroeconomic level debt was only problematic if it existed net towards the foreign sector.

=== Monetary, fiscal and wage policy ===
Flassbeck sees the need for a coordination of monetary policy, wage policy and fiscal policy. He assigns monetary policy an outstanding impact on growth and employment and refuses its shortening on retaining price stability. He declares monetarism failed to control inflation through money supply. It had been practised in the 1980s by some federal banks in response to the oil crisis and the stagflation going along with it in the 1970s but led to drop of investments and high unemployment. It was abandoned by the 1990s.

Flassbeck emphasises the speciality of the German and European monetary policy, which, contrary to the majority of central banks, retained monetarism. Flassbeck cites that the monetary policy of the German Bundesbank and the European Central Bank (ECB) to control the money supply ever geared to the potential output of the past. If economic growth would exceed money supply respectively Gross National Product, the estimated potential output, the ECB would swivel in the Bundesbank already in advance to a restriction course without a noteworthy endangering of price stability by exceeding the target inflation rate. One could never set a potential output beforehand.

Flassbeck also considers the target inflation rate of the ECB to be too low and refers to the height at other major central banks. According to Flassbeck, wage policy should work towards a macroeconomic "distribution neutral" wage adjustment. The optimal rate of wage increases would result from the addition of inflation rate and rise of labour productivity. Flassbeck views the labour agreement on national area as solution best compatible with market economy. The mechanism would accomplish the law of one price, the law of the same price for same goods against the labour market's imperfections and information asymmetries.

=== European Monetary Union and crisis ===
Flassbeck views a currency union primarily as an "inflation community". This means that all member countries of a monetary union had to show the same price change rate. That could only be achieved by equalisation of growth of unit labour costs, with the aim to maintain the price competitiveness of all countries and to avoid high current account surpluses as well as deficits. As consequence for the eurozone he requests that all euro states had to comply with the Central Bank's target inflation rate. Because Germany had seriously undershot this target inflation rate through its concept of "wage restraint" since introduction of the monetary union, while other countries have met or slightly exceeded it, the German industry had gained market share on a large scale to the expense of the other countries in the eurozone. As solution for this problem, which he considers as the fundamental cause of the euro crisis, he proposes coordination of wage policies in the European monetary union. In view of the facts that the option of revaluations and devaluations is not given anymore because of the abolition of national currencies, the only alternative was a real devaluation of states with high current account deficits such as Spain, Portugal, Greece and Italy, as well as a real revaluation of Germany — brought by steadily higher wage increases in Germany than in the other eurozone countries.

=== German "Wirtschaftswunder" ===
Flassbeck does not attribute the Wirtschaftswunder (German for economic miracle) in the 1950s and 1960s to the economic policy of Ludwig Erhard and his only partially applied concept of an ordoliberal social market economy, but to the American monetary policy which, during the time of the Bretton Woods system (until about 1973), had significantly influenced the German interest level. Also, the steady exchange rates which often reflected an underrated D-Mark (former German currency), had essentially benefited the catching up of the other countries. Furthermore, Flassbeck compares the German economy growth in the years of the "Wirtschaftswunder" with other countries and concludes that West German growth rates were only slightly higher than those of France and Italy in the 1950s, but that already in the 1960s, it was slower than the average of those countries. In comparison with the growth of the Japanese economy, which much less had been geared to market economy and competition, the economic miracle appeared "like a stroll". Only the United Kingdom had not been able to keep up with that continental European and Japanese development.

== Statements on today's economic policy and the European crisis ==
In media Flassbeck frequently holds his views on economic policy and theory, which in part are in favour of Keynesianism and particularly Joseph Schumpeter and Wilhelm Lautenbach. In April 2010, facing the beginning monetary crisis, also called euro crisis in Germany, he demanded to "separate the deals of the gamblers from the normal market activities" of banks. The function of rating agencies should no longer be left to the private sector. The austerity requested from Greece was unrealistic; the principal problem was not Greece but the economic imbalance in the European economic area, in particular concerning the competitiveness of the South European countries.

A working market economy in the 21st century had the following needs/necessities/musts:

"It will take a Global Governance. Globalisation requires global rules. The G-20-states are a step towards that, albeit not the best one. Better would be the UNO, but things take very long there. Moreover the European monetary union must be rescued, otherwise the European Union will fall apart too. Thirdly, the participation of all people must domestically be secured. Wages must rise — as much as the increase in productivity. At climate protection the oil price must not be set by speculation anymore — it is to be taken out of market system and supranationally controlled."

In May 2013 Flassbeck wrote, it was irresponsible in the political discourse to repress the option to exit the Euro and that Germany without doubt would be hit hard in an exit scenario. On the possibilities to solve the crisis in the eurozone he demanded Germany to radically change its position to reduce the slope of competitiveness in the eurozone.

On the question if the government would behave successfully in the Euro crisis, Flassbeck in an interview with n-TV commented:

"Nothing has happened at the internal economic trend. We have driven the other countries against the wall. Our customers are on the way going bust ... I don't know if one can call that successful."

== Publications ==
=== German ===
- Environment and Economy (German: Umwelt und Wirtschaft). By Heiner Flassbeck and Gerhard Maier-Rigaud, Tübingen 1982, ISBN 3-16-344528-4
- Free Trade, GATT and the International Currency System (German: Freihandel, GATT und das internationale Währungssystem). Tübingen 1985, ISBN 3-16-344959-X
- Prices, Interest and Exchange Rate (German: Preise, Zins und Wechselkurs). Tübingen 1988, ISBN 3-16-345343-0
- Rigit Prices, flexible Quantities (German: Rigide Preise, flexible Mengen). By Heiner Flassbeck, Gustav Adolf Horn und Rudolf Zwiener, Berlin 1992, ISBN 3-428-07521-8
- Red-Green – yet another project? (German: Rot-Grün – noch ein Projekt?) Hannover 2001, ISBN 3-930345-25-0
- Glasperlenspiel oder Ökonomie – Der Niedergang der Wirtschaftswissenschaften. In: Blätter für deutsche und internationale Politik, Ausgabe 9/2004, p. 1071–1079.
- 50 simple things you should know about economy (German: 50 einfache Dinge, die Sie über unsere Wirtschaft wissen sollten). Frankfurt 2006, ISBN 3-938060-08-5
- The End of Mass Unemployment. Winning the future through proper economic policy (German: Das Ende der Massenarbeitslosigkeit. Mit richtiger Wirtschaftspolitik die Zukunft gewinnen). By Heiner Flassbeck and Friederike Spiecker, Frankfurt 2007, ISBN 978-3938060209
- Failed. Why politics surrender to economy (German: Gescheitert. Warum die Politik vor der Wirtschaft kapituliert). Frankfurt 2009, ISBN 978-3-938060-22-3
- The Market Economy of the 21st Century (German: Die Marktwirtschaft des 21. Jahrhunderts). Frankfurt 2010, ISBN 3-938060-54-9
- Ten Myths of Crisis (German: Zehn Mythen der Krise). Berlin 2012, ISBN 978-3518062203
- Aberration Basic Income. The large distribution from bottom to top must be quit (German: Irrweg Grundeinkommen. Die große Umverteilung von unten nach oben muss beendet werden). By Heiner Flassbeck, Friederike Spiecker, Volker Meinhardt and Dieter Vesper, Frankfurt 2012, ISBN 978-3-86489-006-2
- Act Now! The Global Manifesto to rescue Economy (German: Handelt Jetzt! Das globale Manifest zur Rettung der Wirtschaft). By Heiner Flassbeck, Paul Davidson, James K. Galbraith, Richard Koo und Jayati Ghosh, Frankfurt 2013, ISBN 978-3-86489-034-5
- 66 strong Theses on Euro, on Economic Policy, and on the German Character (German: 66 starke Thesen zum Euro, zur Wirtschaftspolitik und zum deutschen Wesen). Frankfurt 2014, ISBN 978-3-86489-055-0
- together with co-author Costas Lapavitsas: Only Germany can rescue the euro: the last act is starting (German: Nur Deutschland kann den Euro retten: Der letze Akt beginnt). Westend Verlag, Frankfurt am Main 2015. ISBN 978-3-86489-096-3 (Print); ISBN 978-3-86489-586-9 (eBook).

=== English ===
- With Paul Davidson, James K. Galbraith, Richard Koo und Jayati Ghosh, Economic Reform Now: A Global Manifesto to Rescue our Sinking Economies (Palgrave Macmillan, 2013). ISBN 9781137361653
- With Costas Lapavitsas, Against the Troika: Crisis and Austerity in the Eurozone, (Verso, 2015). ISBN 9781784783136
