= Beggar thy neighbour =

Economic improvement attempt that causes worse conditions for other countries

In economics, a beggar-thy-neighbour policy is an economic policy through which one country attempts to remedy its economic problems by means that tend to worsen the economic problems of other countries.

Adam Smith made reference to the term in claiming mercantilist economic doctrine taught nations "that their interest lies in beggaring all their neighbours". The term was originally devised to characterise policies of trying to cure domestic depression and unemployment by shifting effective demand away from imports onto domestically produced goods, either through tariffs and quotas on imports or by competitive devaluation. The policy can be associated with mercantilism and neomercantilism and the resultant barriers to pan-national single markets. According to economist Joan Robinson, beggar-thy-neighbour policies were widely adopted by major economies during the Great Depression of the 1930s.

Alan Deardorff has analysed beggar-thy-neighbour policies as an instance of the prisoner's dilemma known from game theory: each country individually has an incentive to follow such a policy, thereby making everyone (including themselves) worse off.

Reconciling the dilemma of beggar-thy-neighbor policies involves realizing that trade is not a zero-sum game, but rather the comparative advantage of each economy offers real gains from trade for all.

An early 20th-century appearance of the term is seen in the title of a work on economics from the early period of the Great Depression:

- Gower, E. A., Beggar My Neighbour!: The Reply to the Rate Economy Ramp, Manchester: Assurance Agents' Press, 1932.

The phrase is in widespread use, as seen in such publications as The Economist and BBC News.

== Extended application ==
"Beggar thy neighbour" strategies of this kind are not limited to countries: overgrazing provides another example, where the pursuit by individuals or groups of their own interests leads to problems. This dynamic was dubbed the "tragedy of the commons" in an 1833 essay by British economist William Forster Lloyd, though it appears as early as the works of Plato and Aristotle.

These trade policies can lead to trade wars between countries. These trade wars follow the prisoner's dilemma game theory analysis developed through Nash equilibrium in which two countries are poised against each other to produce in the market. Production requires export subsidies for the domestic firm to capture the market, effectively deterring the competing entity. Imagine two companies: Boeing and Airbus, one American, one European firm. They can either choose to produce or to not produce. The matrix follows that if both produce both will lose market share (−5,−5) as they compete in the industry. If they both do not produce (0,0) nobody benefits. If one produces whilst the other does not (100,0) the producing company will capture the industry and have 100% share (0,100). Game theory states that the first mover, or the initial firm in the industry, will always win. The competing firm will have no incentive to enter the market once the competitor has the advantage and thus will be deterred. However, with a strategic trade policy of an export subsidy, the matrix changes as the protecting government covers some of the costs. The matrix now changes from (−5,−5) to (−5,20) in favour of the domestic firm with the subsidy. This will see the protected firm win in the game and capture more of the market share as the subsidies burden the costs, which would otherwise deter the company. The game does not finish here, as the other company, being usurped on the second move, will then itself become protected through export subsidies, leading to a trade war between countries. Ergo, beggar-thy-neighbour is evident in trade wars as it increases the domestic welfare at the expense of the competing country.

== Other uses ==
The term has also been used as the title of a number of literary works:

- Gerard, Emily and Gerard, Dorothea, Beggar My Neighbour: A Novel, W. Blackwood and Sons (Edinburgh), 1882.
- Drew, Sarah, Beggar My Neighbour, J. M. Ousley & Son (London), 1922.
- Fielden, Lionel, Beggar My Neighbour, Secker and Warburg (London), 1943.
- Ridley, Arnold, Beggar My Neighbour: A Comedy in Three Acts, Evans Bros. (London), 1953.
- Macelwee, Patience, Beggar My Neighbour, Hodder and Stoughton (London), 1956.

== See also ==
- Balance of trade
- Currency intervention
- Dutch disease
- Choum § Railway tunnel
- Internal devaluation
- International trade
- Paradox of competition
- Producerism
- Protectionism
