= Paradox of competition =

Paradox of competition in economics names a model of a situation where measures, which offer a competitive advantage to an individual economic entity, lead to nullification of advantage if all others behave in the same way. In some cases the finite state is even more disadvantageous for everybody than before (for the totality as well as for the individual). The term Paradox of competition (German: Konkurrenzparadoxon) was coined by German economist Wolfgang Stützel. It is about a case of a rationality trap.

Stützel distinguishes three categories of paradoxes of competition:

1. Circuit paradoxes
2. Classical paradoxes
3. Marx paradoxes

== Examples ==
- Advertising: the overall demand for detergent is assumed steady. By advertisement the individual venture can expand its share in market at the expense of its competitors. But if all producers of detergent do the same, their expenses for advertisement rise without gaining higher sales at large, so that profits even decline.
- Opening hours: assumed the legislator extends the allowed opening hours by two hours. Now when an individual shop applies that new opening hours, though it has to pay more work, it can gain higher sales and thereby more profit. But if all shops practise the extended opening hours, customers can shop again at other shops with similar supply and the potential sales volume again allocates to all (similar) shops.
- Wage policy: for each individual country counts: a state can improve its price competitiveness in comparison with other states by a restrained wage policy. But from that it does just not follow that all countries (can) improve their competitiveness when they apply restrained wage policy.
- Current account balance: a current account surplus is to the expense of an others state current account deficit – insofar not all can improve their balance at the same time. On the contrary – if all simultaneously begin to cut down their imports they will have a decline of balance in their current account in the end. (see also: protectionism in the 1930s: Smoot–Hawley Tariff Act).
- Currency devaluation: an individual state with own currency can achieve to lower overseas prices of its export goods by means of currency devaluation. All countries together in total cannot do so. If countries undersell each other with devaluations, the danger of currency war grows, consequence of which is a spiral of devaluation.
- Video game development: assuming the best time to release a game is a release window few people have chosen, game developers are more likely to choose the same release window as other developers, as they are all looking for one that meets this same criteria. The more developers avoid a release window due to fear of competition, the less competition there will be for said release window.

== Partial sentence, Global sentence, lead and lag effect ==
Wolfgang Stützel analyses paradoxes of competition using the concept of Balances Mechanics (German: Saldenmechanik). Specifically he defines and distinguishes validness which is valid for individual economic entities respectively individual groups (Partial sentence), and validness which counts for the totality of economic entities (Global sentence).

Concerning the pursuit of export surpluses he distinguishes as follows:

- Partial sentence: Every country can achieve export surpluses by expanding its export. Every country can achieve export surpluses by reducing its import.
- Global sentence: The sum of export always equals the sum of import.

On overall economy examination (macroeconomics, aggregation problem) the benefit which individual economies want to achieve for themselves (legitimately) often appears as so called lead effect as against an inevitable lag effect of others. When lag effects are condoned, no paradox of competition arises. Solely because individual supply and individual demand turn out to be more elastic than overall supply and overall demand the classical paradox of competition can occur.

== See also ==
- Paradox of saving
- Market failure
- Balances Mechanics
- Tragedy of the commons

== Literature ==
- Peter Bofinger: Grundzüge der Volkswirtschaftslehre. Pearson Studium, München 2006. ISBN 3-8273-7222-4
- Wolfgang Stützel: Paradoxa der Geld- und Konkurrenzwirtschaft. Aalen 1979. ISBN 3-511-09029-6
- Rolf-Dieter Grass, Wolfgang Stützel: Volkswirtschaftslehre. München 1988, p. 156-165.
