= Principles of Economics (Mankiw book) =

Economics book

- Author: N. Gregory Mankiw
- Published: 1997 (Harcourt)
- ISBN: 0-030-27087-1

Principles of Economics is an introductory economics textbook by Harvard economics professor N. Gregory Mankiw. It was first published in 1997 and has ten editions as of 2024. The book was discussed before its publication for the large advance Mankiw received for it from its publisher Harcourt and has sold over a million copies over its lifetime, generating Mankiw at least $42 million. After criticism about the price from students Mankiw decided to donate the textbook royalties from his students to charity.

Principles of Economics is the standard textbook for American economics departments' introductory classes. The current publisher Cengage claims it is the "most popular economics textbook".

== 10 Principles ==
The book introduces 10 principles of economics "that supposedly represent the heart of economic wisdom".

They are listed by Mankiw as follows:

1. People face trade-offs

2. The cost of something is what you give up to get it

3. Rational people think at the margin

4. People respond to incentives

5. Trade can make everyone better off

6. Markets are usually a good way to organize economic activity

7. Governments can sometimes improve market outcomes

8. A country's standard of living depends on its ability to produce goods and services

9. Prices rise when the government prints too much money

10. Society faces a short-run tradeoff between inflation and unemployment.

Peter Bofinger has criticized the book for creating the "impression that the economic principles explained correspond to a kind of economic consensus", which it denies.
