= Harvey S. Rosen =

American economist

Harvey Rosen
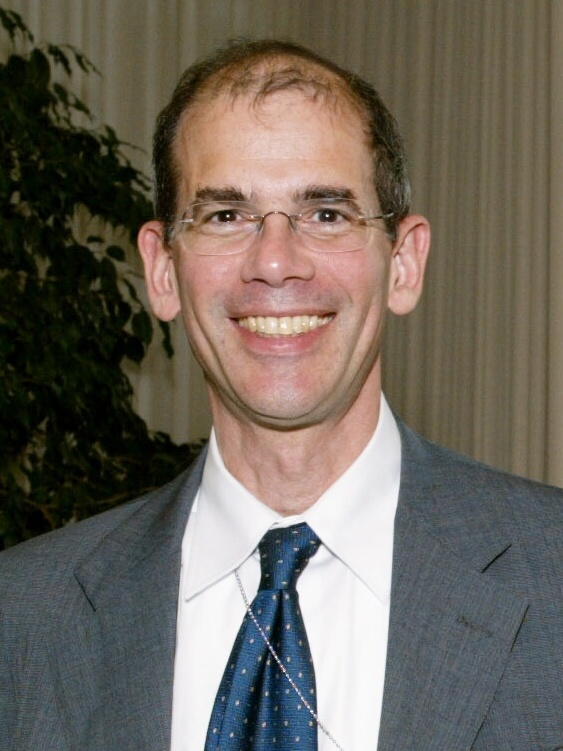

22nd Chairman of the Council of Economic Advisers
- In office February 23, 2005 – June 10, 2005
- President: George W. Bush
- Preceded by: Greg Mankiw
- Succeeded by: Ben Bernanke

Personal details
- Born: March 29, 1949 (age 76) Chicago, Illinois, U.S.
- Political party: Republican
- Spouse: Marsha Novick
- Children: 2
- Education: University of Michigan, Ann Arbor (BA); Harvard University (MA, PhD)

Academic background
- Doctoral advisor: Martin Feldstein

Academic work
- Doctoral students: Douglas Holtz-Eakin
- Website: Information at IDEAS / RePEc

Harvey Sheldon Rosen (born 29 March 1949) is an American economist and academic. Prior to his retirement and subsequent appointment as Emeritus Professor in 2019, Rosen was the John L. Weinberg Professor of Economics and Business Policy at Princeton University, and former chairperson of the Council of Economic Advisers. His research focuses on public finance. Harvard University economist and former Council of Economic Advisers chairman Greg Mankiw credits Rosen as one of four mentors who taught him how to practice economics, along with Alan Blinder, Larry Summers, and Stanley Fischer.

In 2007, Rosen was awarded the Daniel M. Holland Medal by the National Tax Association in recognition for lifetime achievement in taxation and public finance.

== Early life and education ==
Rosen attended the University of Michigan, where he was a member of Phi Beta Kappa society and received a bachelor's degree in economics in 1970. Rosen also attended Harvard University, where he received his master's degree and Ph.D. in economics in 1972 and 1974, respectively.

== Career ==
Rosen has been an Associate Researcher at the National Bureau of Economic Research since 1978, where he has focused on taxes and commerce. In 1981 he was a visiting scholar at the Hoover Institute, and in 1986 was a Fellow at the Econometric Society. From 1989 to 1991 he worked at the United States Department of Treasury as the Deputy Assistant Secretary for Tax Analysis. He served as a member of the Council of Economic Advisors from 2003 to 2005, and served as chairman in 2005. Rosen is currently the John L. Weinberg Professor of Economics and Business Policy at Princeton University, where he has previously served as chairman of the department from 1993 to 1996, and was a co-director at the Princeton University Center for Economic Policy Studies from 1993 to 2011. His work at Princeton focuses on teaching undergraduate courses in public finance, taxation, and introductory microeconomics, and graduate courses in public finance.

In 2013, Rosen was a signatory to an amicus curiae brief submitted to the Supreme Court in support of same-sex marriage during the Hollingsworth v. Perry case.

Political offices
Preceded by Greg Mankiw	Chair of the Council of Economic Advisers; 2005	Succeeded by Ben Bernanke
