= Economic entity =

Concept in accounting

An economic entity is one of the assumptions made in generally accepted accounting principles. Almost any type of organization or unit in society can be an economic entity. Examples of economic entities in accounting are hospitals, companies, municipalities, and federal agencies.

The "Economic entity assumption" states that the activities of the entity are to be kept separate from the activities of its owner and all other economic entities.

== See also ==
- Piercing the corporate veil
