= Peter Bofinger =

German economist

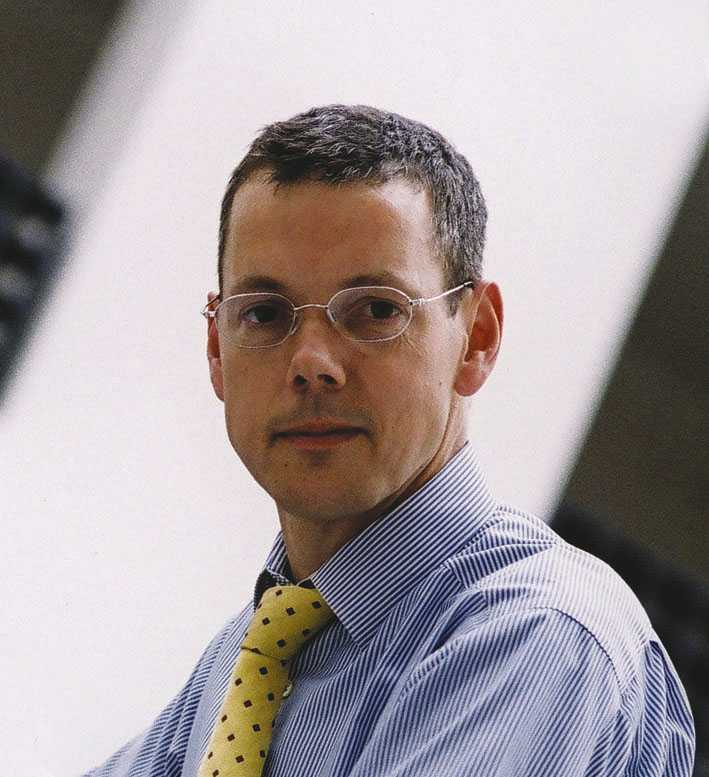
- Bofinger in 2005
- Born: September 18, 1954 (age 72); Pforzheim, West Germany

Academic background
- Influences: John Maynard Keynes; Karl Schiller; Wolfgang Stützel

Academic work
- Discipline: Economics
- School or tradition: Keynesian economics

Peter Bofinger (born 1954) is a German economist and a former member of the German Council of Economic Experts.

== Early life and education ==
Peter Bofinger was born on 18 September 1954 in Pforzheim. He studied Economics in the Saarland University of Saarbrücken from 1973 to 1978, and, upon completion of his diploma, he received his doctorate there in 1984 with the thesis Währungswettbewerb. Eine systematische Darstellung und kritische Würdigung von Friedrich August von Hayeks Plänen zu einer grundlegenden Neugestaltung unserer Währungsordnung ("Currency competition. A systematic presentation and critical assessment of Friedrich August von Hayek's plans for a fundamental redesign of our monetary system"). In 1990, he completed his habilitation in the same University with his thesis on Festkurssysteme und geldpolitische Koordination ("Fixed exchange rate systems and monetary policy coordination").

== Career ==
Following his studies, Bofinger worked as staff member to the Council of Economic Experts between 1978 and 1981. From 1984 until 1990, he was an economist at the Bundesbank. Since 1992, Bofinger has been a professor at the University of Würzburg. Between 1997 and 1999, he served as Dean of the university’s Department of Economics.

== Council of Economic Experts ==
Nominated by Germany’s trade unions, Bofinger succeeded Jürgen Kromphardt as member of the Council of Economic Experts in 2004. He has in the past oftentimes disagreed with the Council’s conclusions.

During the period between 2012 and 2017, he issued 26 of the Council’s 27 minority votes. Among Bofinger's solitary dissensions to established policy was his 2010 advocacy for the adoption in Germany of a minimum hourly wage of 6 Euros, revising upwards his previous proposal for 4,50 Euros.

In 2013, he argued that a "five percent [wage] increase across all sectors" is necessary to prevent "wage dumping" and ensure that full-time employment provides "enough income," stressing his disagreement with the dominant position that a minimum wage would have a negative impact on employment.

In 2005, Chancellor Gerhard Schröder proposed that Bofinger should replace Otmar Issing on the Executive Board of the European Central Bank (ECB) the following year; the post eventually went to economist Jürgen Stark.

From December 2011 until May 2012, Bofinger served in the Jacques Delors Institute’s Tommaso Padoa-Schioppa group, established by the Jacques Delors Institute with the task of "reflect[ing] on the reform of the Economic and Monetary Union of the European Union."

== Fiscal policy in the European Union ==
Bofinger has written extensively on the need for European Union-wide state investment to combat the effects of climate change. In this, he acknowledges the obstacle that stands in the way of the required fiscal policy. That obstacle, Bofinger writes, is the "mindset, which says that governments must not borrow, they must not add to the national debt, and they must not spend more than they receive in revenue;" in other words, a bias against budget deficits, which calls for zero deficits, a target named in Germany Schwarze Null, or Black Zero. The bias comes from historical experience, he explains, such as the 1920's hyper inflation period, but it is not exclusive to Germany. In fact, it is taught in standard economic texts in almost all economics classes around the world. (Note: Bofinger cites the highly popular in university classes book Principles of Economics of American economist Greg Mankiw, in which, it is stated falsely, as Bofinger claims, that public debt "crowds out," i.e. inhibits or makes more expensive, private-sector debt. See Christensen (2020).)

In the same vein, Bofinger denounces the "arbitrary" and baseless criteria for fiscal policy set down by the Maastricht Treaty, such as limiting state debt to a maximum of 60% of yearly GDP. (Note: Bofinger writes that if a debt limit means you spend less on the things that matter, then the limit is almost criminal.)

== Euro area crisis ==
In the 2016 Davos symposium, Bofinger asserted that inadequacies in the monetary union's structure along with distinct market failures led to the euro area crisis. He argued that, while the European Stability Mechanism (ESM) limits the risk of contagion effects, thereby increasing the credibility of the no-bailout clause, government creditors may undervalue risks due to the availability of crisis assistance. The ECM, he continued, will not bring about full market-discipline unless it is complemented by insolvency proceedings for sovereign member-states, so that, in severe crises, a restructuring of sovereign debt becomes a precondition for ESM support. He pointed out to supporters of the self-regulating market "dogma" that the markets were saved by the governments from the consequences of "irrational exuberance," arguing that, therefore, it'd be illogical, to support an institutional framework where these same markets shall discipline governments.

Absent a lender of last resort, a small sustainability shock could be amplified without bound due to the deadly helix of rising risk premiums and deteriorating budget deficits stemming from higher debt-servicing costs.

In its December 2019 review of the monetary policy followed during the first twenty years of the Euro, the European Central Bank acknowledged that Bofinger was the first economist to express, as early as April 1999, significant concerns about the lack of a firm floor in the Bank’s price-stability range:

[T]he present Harmonised Index of Consumer Prices inflation rate of 0.8 % would be close to deflation for all central banks except the Reserve Bank of New Zealand. Thus, for most central banks it would indicate a need for an expansionary policy stance, while the ECB seems to regard this as 'price stability'. [What is required is] a more transparent definition of ECB’s inflation target, preferably in the form of a band with a precise upper and lower bound.

== Industrial state policy ==
In an article published in 2017 in the Frankfurter Allgemeine Zeitung, Bofinger argued that a state organized industrial policy promotes technological progress more than free competition, citing research undertaken by Mariana Mazzucato, Ha-Joon Chang, and others. He argued that the recent, post-monetary union record of bank failures, as well as the wave of nuclear companies' and diesel manufacturers' bankruptcies, should bring forth the discussion for "a more active industrial policy for Germany and Europe."

Four of his fellow members of the Council of Economic Experts, professor for Economic Policy at the University of Freiburg Lars Feld, Economic Policy and Applied Econometrics chairman at the Faculty of Management and Economics of the Ruhr University Bochum Christoph M. Schmidt, European Central Bank Executive Board member Isabel Schnabel, and professor of Monetary Economics at the Goethe University Frankfurt Volker Wieland published, one week later, a letter in the same newspaper, in response to the Bofinger article. They explicitly accused Bofinger that, by supporting a centrally designated policy, he showed that he "understands nothing about Economics," and they reiterated the imperative to entrust the supremacy of free-market competition.

== Dissent on Nobel award ==
Bofinger criticized the awarding of the 2022 Nobel Memorial Prize in Economic Sciences to Ben Bernanke, Douglas Diamond and Philip Dybvig as "[a] noble award for a ‘popular misconception’", because the award committee's description of banking ("they receive money from people making deposits and channel it to borrowers") has been refuted by at least two major central banks, the Bank of England and the Deutsche Bundesbank.

== Selected publications ==
- Bofinger, Peter (1996). "The economics of orthodox money-based stabilisations (OMBS): The recent experience of Kazakhstan, Russia and the Ukraine". European Economic Review. 40 (3–5): 663–671. doi:10.1016/0014-2921(95)00076-3.
- Bofinger, Peter (2000). "A framework for stabilizing the euro/yen/dollar triplet". North American Journal of Economics and Finance. 11 (2): 137–151. CiteSeerX 10.1.1.512.1539. doi:10.1016/S1062-9408(00)00039-5.
- Bofinger, Peter; Reischle, Julian; Schächter, Andrea (2001). Monetary Policy: Goals, Institutions, Strategies, and Instruments. New York: Oxford University Press. ISBN 978-0-19-924856-8.
- Bofinger, P; Wollmershäuser, Timo (2001). "Is there a third way to EMU for the EU accession countries?". Economic Systems. 25 (3): 253–274. doi:10.1016/S0939-3625(01)00021-8.
- Bofinger, Peter; Wollmershäuser, Timo (2003). "Managed Floating as a Monetary Policy Strategy". Economics of Planning. 36 (2): 81–109. doi:10.1023/B:ECOP.0000012258.15614.d8. S2CID 153630647.

== Other activities ==
=== Non-profit organizations ===
- Business Forum of the Social Democratic Party of Germany: Member of the Advisory Board on Economic Policy, since 2020.
- European Council on Foreign Relations: Member of the Board.
- Institute for New Economic Thinking (INET): Member of the Council on the Euro Zone Crisis (ICEC).
- Representative of Science to the Senate.
- Progressive Economy journal: Member of the Scientific Advisory Board.
- Verein für Socialpolitik ("Association for Social Policy"): Member of the Committee on Monetary Policy.
- Levy Economics Institute of Bard College: Monetary Policy and Financial Structure scholar.

=== Editorial boards ===
- International Journal of Economics and Finance (IJEF): Member of the Board of Editors
- Wirtschaftsdienst journal: Member of the Scientific Advisory Board
