= Costas Lapavitsas =

Greek economist and politician

- Kώστας Λαπαβίτσας
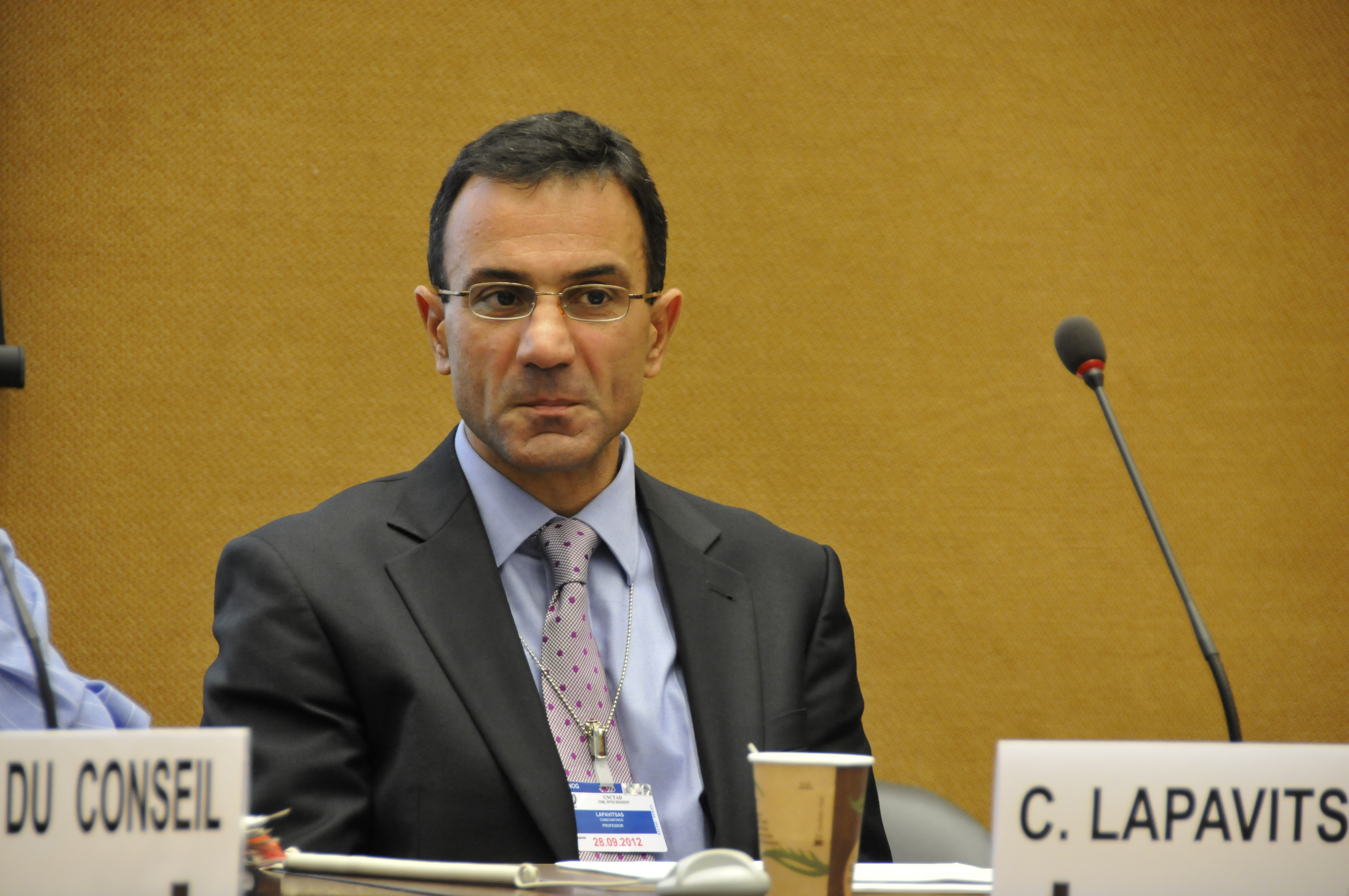
- Costas Lapavitsas in 2013
- Born: 20 January 1961 (age 65); Thessaloniki, Greece

Academic background
- Education: London School of Economics; Birkbeck, University of London (PhD)
- Influences: Karl Marx, John Maynard Keynes

Academic work
- Discipline: Public economics, political economy, financialization
- School or tradition: Marxism; Euroscepticism
- Institutions: School of Oriental and African Studies

Costas Lapavitsas (Greek: Kώστας Λαπαβίτσας; born January 20, 1961) is a professor of economics at the School of Oriental and African Studies, University of London and was elected as a member of the Hellenic Parliament for the left-wing Syriza party in the January 2015 general election. He subsequently defected to the Popular Unity in August 2015.

== Academic career ==
In 1982, Lapavitsas obtained a master's degree at the London School of Economics, followed in 1986 by a PhD at Birkbeck College, University of London. Since 1999, he has taught economics at the School of Oriental and African Studies, first as a lecturer and since 2008 as a professor.

== Political career ==
Lapavitsas is known for his criticism of the modern Western financial system, particularly the Greek government-debt crisis, the European debt crisis and the European Union. He is also a columnist for the British newspaper The Guardian. In 2007, he founded Research on Money and Finance (RMF), an international network of political economists focusing on money, finance and the evolution of contemporary capitalism.

As early as 2011, Lapavitsas, together with some other Greek economists, has been highly eurosceptic, advocating for Greece abandoning the euro and returning to its former national currency (the drachma) as a response to the Greek government-debt crisis. On 2 March 2015, Lapavitsas wrote in The Guardian that releasing Greek people from austerity and simultaneously avoiding a major falling-out with the eurozone is an impossible task for the new government of Greece.

In July 2015, Lapavitsas endorsed Jeremy Corbyn's campaign in the Labour Party leadership election, saying: "If he succeeds – and I hope he does – he's exactly what Britain could do with, what the Labour Party could do with. I think that would be a very important move for the rest of Europe and for Greece. It would give a boost to the kind of thinking that would be necessary in the rest of Europe that is so sadly lacking at the moment. It would be the best thing to come out of Britain for Europe in a long time".

== Bibliography ==
=== Books ===
- Lapavitsas, Costas (29 August 2023). The State of Capitalism: Economy, Society, and Hegemony. Verso Books. ISBN 978-1-83976-785-2.
- The Left Case Against the EU (Polity Press, 2018). ISBN 9781509531066
- Marxist Monetary Theory: Collected Papers (Brill, 2017). ISBN 978-90-04-27270-5
- (in Greek) Word for word: Writings on the Greek Crisis (Athens: Topos Press, 2014). ISBN 978-9-60499-096-2
- Profiting Without Producing: How Finance Exploits Us All (2013). ISBN 9781781681411
- Crisis in the Eurozone (2012). ISBN 9781844679690
- Financialisation in Crisis (Brill, 2012). ISBN 978-90-04-20107-1
- (in Spanish) El capitalismo financiarizado Expansión y crisis (2009). ISBN 978-84-936641-8-3
- editor with Makoto Noguchi, Beyond Market-Driven Development (Routledge, 2004). ISBN 978-0-415-64606-2
- Social Foundations of Markets, Money and Credit (Routledge, 2003). ISBN 978-1-13-881080-8
- co-author with Makoto Itoh, Political Economy of Money and Finance. (London-Basingstoke: Macmillan, 1998). ISBN 9780333665220

=== Interviews ===
- "Greece: Phase Two", Jacobin (12 March 2015). Retrieved 2 April 2018.
- Costas Lapavitsas on HARDtalk, BBC (12 January 2015). Retrieved 2 April 2018.
- "The Credit Crunch", International Socialism 117 (Winter 2008). Retrieved 2 April 2018.

=== Articles ===
- Costas Lapavitsas on the Guardian
- Costas Lapavitsas on Jacobin

=== Public Lectures ===
- "Profiting Without Producing: How Finance Exploits Us All ", Boston University (5 March 2014). Retrieved 16 December 2023.
