= Wolfgang Stützel =

German economist

- Born: 23 January 1925; Aalen, Germany
- Died: 1 March 1987 (aged 62); Saarbrücken, West Germany

Academic background
- Influences: John Maynard Keynes

Academic work
- Discipline: Economics, Monetary economics, Macroeconomics
- Institutions: 1945–52 University of Tübingen; 1952–53 London School of Economics; 1953–56 Berliner Bank; 1957–58 German Federal Bank; 1958–87 Saarland University; 1966–68 German Council of Economic Experts
- Notable ideas: Balances Mechanics of Economics, Paradoxes of competition
- Awards: Ludwig Erhard Prize for Economics Journalism, Honorary doctorate University of Tübingen, Grand Cross of the Order of Merit of the Federal Republic of Germany

Wolfgang Stützel (23 January 1925, in Aalen, Germany – 1 March 1987, in Saarbrücken, West Germany) was a German economist and professor of economics at the Saarland University, Germany. From 1966 to 1968 he was member of the German Council of Economic Experts (German: Sachverständigenrat zur Begutachtung der gesamtwirtschaftlichen Entwicklung).

He coined the concept of Macroeconomic Mechanics of Balances (German: Volkswirtschaftliche Saldenmechanik).

Among other things, balances mechanics enabled the theories of John Maynard Keynes in which he argued that government deficit spending can be necessary during a deflationary depression to be placed on a formal, structural arithmetic foundation based on accounting identities. Stützel used balances mechanics to explain how a deflationary depression results from aggregate planned revenues from sales of goods being greater than aggregate planned expenditures on purchasing goods. He also showed on the same basis how an inflationary exuberance results from aggregate planned expenditures for purchasing goods being greater than aggregate planned revenues from sales of goods. He, therefore, not only explained the validity of Keynes' theory of demand-driven output and employment but also showed that it applies only in the special case of a buyer's market situation.

== Life ==
Wolfgang Stützel was born in Aalen, Baden-Württemberg, Germany. His father Hermann Stützel was a chemist, a master codebreaker in both war and peacetime, and ran a small pottery factory. His mother Frieda (Hennig) was from Wittenberg. He had three older siblings, a brother and two sisters. He was a talented musician and became a student of Elly Ney at the Salzburger Mozarteum in 1943.

In the spring of 1945, after one and a half years in a radio operators squad, he escaped from captivity in Italy. He began to study Protestant theology and ancient languages in Tübingen, Germany, because only the theology faculty was still operational.

He began studying economics in 1947. He received his diploma in 1950, and a doctorate in 1952 for his thesis on The Relation of the Economy to the State (German: Verhältnis der Wirtschaft zum Staat).

After two years as an assistant to Prof. Brinkmann in Tübingen, during which he finished his habilitation on Paradoxes of Monetary Economies, he got a research scholarship at the London School of Economics. From 1953-1956 he worked as vice head of the national economics department of the Berliner Bank. From 1957-1958 worked as a research associate and later a department head for publications and special functions at the German Bundesbank (Central Bank of the Federal Republic of Germany).

In 1958, Stützel wrote about Balances Mechanics of Macroeconomic Relations: A Contribution to the Theory of Money (German: Saldenmechanik makroökonomischer Zusammenhänge). As a result, at age 33 he was appointed by Professor Herbert Giersch to be a professor at Saarbrücken. He focused on banking management and national economics with emphasis on money, currency and credit.

Stützel became a member of the German Council of Economic Experts (Sachverständigenrat zur Begutachtung der gesamtwirtschaftlichen Entwicklung) in February 1966, then resigned in September 1968 because he did not support the revaluation of the Deutsche Mark and his dissenting view was not accepted.

In the 1970s, he became involved in the FDP, a small German liberal party, as a city counselor, parliamentary candidate, and member of several party boards on the national level.

He taught for almost thirty years as a professor at Saarland University, refusing several job offers at other universities.

In 1986, Stützel suffered a stroke from which he did not recover. He committed suicide in 1987. He left three adult children.

== Awards ==
- 1978: Ludwig Erhard Prize for Economics Journalism
- 1985: Honorary doctorate of the Juristic Faculty of the Eberhard Karls University, Tübingen
- 1985: Grand Cross of the Order of Merit of the Federal Republic of Germany (German: Großes Bundesverdienstkreuz)

== Memberships ==
- 1958–1987: Professor at the faculty of economics at Saarland University', Germany
- 1966–1968: German Council of Economic Experts (German: Sachverständigenrat zur Begutachtung der gesamtwirtschaftlichen Entwicklung)
- 1982–1987: Kronberger Kreis

== Economic points of view ==
In his early years, Stützel adhered to Keynesian theories, as publisher of the papers by Wilhelm Lautenbach. After the development of his Balances Mechanics of Economocs (German: Volkswirtschaftliche Saldenmechanik), he adopted a critical approach against the prevailing doctrines of economics.

In the 1970s, Stützel veered away more and more from Keynesian and demand-driven positions. After the recession of 1973/74, high unemployment had developed. Stützel viewed that as a structural rather than a cyclical problem and advocated for cuts in the social sector and the reduction of job security protections. In his book Market Price and Human Dignity (German: Marktpreis und Menschenwürde, 1981) he argued for a conversion of the social state according to the views of economic liberalism in the Kronberger Kreis.

In his book, he explains his thesis that "good social intentions“ can often have "evil social outcomes“ - for example, strong job protections or excessive tariffs would reduce the ability of employers to employ people at all. The obligation for employers to continue to pay salaries in the case of employee illness would decrease the chances of employment for healthy people. He spoke for a "market economy with system compliant social policy“ wherein the state's task is to ensure equal starting conditions and provide help to the weak, but there is little regulatory intervention in to the market economy.

He was already questioning the belief that a healthy market economy would need continuous economic growth in the 1960s.

=== Fiscal and monetary policy ===
In 1968, as a member of the council of economic experts, Stützel refused to support the revaluation of the Deutschemark. The recession of 1967, triggered by the high interest rates set by the German Federal Bank, had strongly decreased inflation in Germany and thereby given a price advantage to German exports. As a dedicated opponent of the revaluation (he was already against revaluation in 1961), Stützel left the board in September 1968, in conflict with the majority of its board members.

== Students and coworker ==
- Peter Bofinger, 1976–78 research assistant and 1981–85 scientific officer at the chair of Wolfgang Stützel.
- Heiner Flassbeck, 1975/76 assistant at chair of Prof. Stützel with emphasis on currency issues.
- Wolfram Engels habilitated 1968 at Wolfgang Stützel in Saarbrücken.
- Otmar Issing listened Prof. Stützel about regulatory policy and long-term effects of instruments of economic policy.

== Works (selection) ==
- Interest, Credit and Production (German: Zins, Kredit und Produktion); Tübingen: Stützel as publisher, Wilhelm Lautenbach, foreword by Wilhelm Röpke) Mohr (Siebeck), 1952 (PDF 1,5 MB)
- Price, Value and Power (German: Preis, Wert und Macht); Aalen: Scientia, 1972 (Unveränd. Neudr. d. Tübinger Diss. 1952) ISBN 978-3511006686
- Balances Mechanics of Economics (German: Volkswirtschaftliche Saldenmechanik); Tübingen: Mohr, 1978 (Nachdr. der 2. Aufl., 2011, Mohr Siebeck) ISBN 978-3161509551 (google books)
- Paradoxes of Money Economy and Competitive Market Economy (German: Paradoxa der Geld- und Konkurrenzwirtschaft); Aalen: Scientia, 1979 ISBN 978-3511090296
- Market Price and Human Dignity. Theses about Economy- and Education Policy (German: Marktpreis und Menschenwürde. Thesen zur Wirtschafts- und Bildungspolitik); Stuttgart: Bonn Aktuell, 1981 ISBN 978-3879591619
- About our Currency Conditions (German: Über unsere Währungsverhältnisse); Tübingen: Mohr Siebeck, 1983 ISBN 978-3163446328
- Bank Policy - Today and Tomorrow (German: Bankenpolitik – heute und morgen); Frankfurt am Main: Knapp, 1983 (3. unveränd. Auflage / mit Vor- u. Nachwort d. Verfassers / 1. Auflage 1964)
- Wolfgang Stützel - Modern Concepts for Financial Markets, Employment and Economic Constitution (German: Wolfgang Stützel - Moderne Konzepte für Finanzmärkte, Beschäftigung und Wirtschaftsverfassung); Tübingen: publisher Hartmut Schmidt, Mohr Siebeck, 2001 ISBN 978-3161476143 (google books)
