= Wilhelm Lautenbach =

German economist and financier (1891–1948)

Dr. Wilhelm Lautenbach (26 August 1891 in Zwinge – 24 May 1948 in Davos) was a German economist and financial expert who served as a consultant for financial matters in the Ministry of Economics during the 1930s. He primarily focused on currency issues, the German banking crisis, the impact of reparations payments, and the prevalent mass unemployment of the time.

Lautenbach was among the leading German theorists of economic cycles during that period and is still regarded as the most significant precursor to Keynesianism.

The Lautenbach Plan, named after him, was presented by Lautenbach during a secret conference of the Friedrich List Society on September 16–17, 1931. It advocated a dual strategy consisting of wage reductions to expand employment (while maintaining overall wage costs) and implementing economic policies to motivate businesses to invest. However, following the outbreak of the German banking crisis, most companies largely refrained from net investments and replacement investments. Lautenbach recognized that "only through the creation of new credit or the mobilisation of idle funds could such action provide a stimulating boost to the economy."

Due to the restrictions imposed by the internationally bound Central Bank Act and the reparations obligations resulting from World War I, it was not expected that the Lautenbach Plan would receive international approval. Consequently, it was not initially implemented. Nonetheless, Fritz Reinhardt successfully drew upon Lautenbach's financial theories when implementing the Reinhardt Program.

Wilhelm Röpke reported a meeting between Lautenbach and Adolf Hitler in the early summer of 1933 regarding state credit expansion. Lautenbach reportedly led the conversation, responding to Hitler's objection that such credit expansion would lead to inflation by saying, "Mr. Hitler, you are now the most powerful man in Germany. However, there is one thing you cannot do: under the current circumstances, no matter how hard you try, you cannot create inflation."

In 1944, Lautenbach reflected on the challenges of achieving full employment, particularly for an open economy engaged in trade and the exchange of goods with other countries. He highlighted the dependence of smaller countries with limited natural resources and less diversified processing on the prosperity of other nations, stating that their own investment policies could only partially ensure employment and prosperity.

Lautenbach strongly criticized the background of the International Monetary Fund (IMF) when it was established, alongside the World Bank, in Bretton Woods in 1944. He suggested that the shift from Keynes' plan to the creation of the currency fund indicated that the United States was unwilling to relinquish the exploitation of its financial power.

Lautenbach is often referred to as a Keynesian or a pre-Keynesian Keynesian, although some argue that these labels are insufficient given the complexity of the issues he addressed.

German economist Wolfgang Stützel, who developed the accounting identity mechanism known as the Saldenmechanik, acknowledged Wilhelm Lautenbach for his credit mechanism, referring to it as the "Lautenbach Credit Mechanism" („Lautenbachsche Kreditmechanik“)

== Works (selection) ==
- Lautenbach Plan (Möglichkeiten einer Konjunkturbelebung durch Investition und Kreditausweitung), 9. September 1931 (PDF; 151 kB).
