= Piero Sraffa =

Italian economist (1898–1983)

Piero Sraffa FBA
- Born: 5 August 1898; Turin, Italy
- Died: 3 September 1983 (aged 85); Cambridge, England

Academic background
- Education: London School of Economics
- Influences: Ricardo; Smith; Marx; Keynes; Einaudi

Academic work
- Discipline: Political economy
- School or tradition: Neo-Ricardian school
- Institutions: Trinity College, Cambridge

Piero Sraffa FBA (5 August 1898 – 3 September 1983) was an influential Italian political economist who served as lecturer of economics at the University of Cambridge. His book Production of Commodities by Means of Commodities is taken as founding the neo-Ricardian school of economics.

== Early life ==
Sraffa was born in Turin, Kingdom of Italy, to Angelo Sraffa (1865–1937) and Irma Sraffa (née Tivoli) (1873–1949), a wealthy Italian Jewish couple. His father was a professor in commercial law and later dean at the Bocconi University in Milan. Despite being raised as a practising Jew, Sraffa later became an agnostic.

=== Early career ===
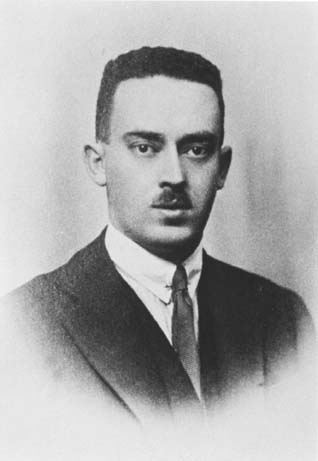
Sraffa, c. 1928.

Due to his father's activity, the young Piero followed him during his academic wanderings (University of Parma, University of Milan and University of Turin), where he met Antonio Gramsci (leader of Communist Party of Italy). They became close friends, partly due to their shared political views. Sraffa was also in contact with Filippo Turati, perhaps the most important leader of the Italian Socialist Party, whom he allegedly met and frequently visited in Rapallo, where his family had a holiday villa. At the age of 18, in the spring of 1917, he began military service as an officer of the Military Engineer Corps, under the command of the First Army as rear-guard. From the end of World War I (November 1918) until March 1920 he was a member of the Royal Commission of Inquiry into the violations of the right of the people committed by the enemy. The military period corresponded to the "university" one; some anecdotes tell of exams done effortlessly wearing the officer uniform. He graduated in November 1920 with a thesis on inflation in Italy during the period of the Great War. His tutor was Luigi Einaudi, one of the most important Italian economists and later a president of the Italian Republic.

From 1921 to 1922, he studied at the London School of Economics. During this period, at Cambridge, he met twice John Maynard Keynes, who invited him to a collaboration. This request led Sraffa to write two articles about the Italian banking system published in 1922, the first (The Bank Crisis in Italy) in The Economic Journal (edited by Keynes) and the second (The current situation of Italian banks) in the supplement of the newspaper Manchester Guardian (now The Guardian). Keynes also entrusted Sraffa with the Italian edition of his A Tract on Monetary Reform. The meeting with Keynes was undoubtedly a fundamental turning point in Sraffa's career.

In 1922 Sraffa was appointed director of the provincial labour department in Milan, where he frequented socialist circles. In this period he made friends with Carlo Rosselli and Raffaele Mattioli, both assistants of Luigi Einaudi at the time.

The march on Rome, with the consequent seizure of power by Mussolini, was an event destined to affect deeply his future. His father Angelo was the target of aggression by a fascist squad and received two very threatening telegrams by Mussolini himself who required a public retraction by Piero on the content of the second article published in the Manchester Guardian. Piero did not write a retraction. In May 1924 his friend Antonio Gramsci, who found himself stuck firstly in Moscow and then in Vienna due to the advent to power of fascism, returned to Rome on his election to Parliament. From now on the relations between the two intellectuals intensified. On 26 November 1926 Italian Parliament approved the law "defence of the state", thus giving rise to the totalitarian state. On 8 November 1926, Antonio Gramsci was arrested. During Gramsci's incarceration, Sraffa supplied books and the material, literally pens and paper, with which Gramsci would write his Prison Notebooks.

== Major works ==
=== The laws of productivity under competitive conditions ===
In 1925, Sraffa wrote about returns to scale and perfect competition. In the 1926 article, "The Laws of Returns under Competitive Conditions", published in The Economic Journal, Sraffa resumes and develops his work of 1925 to show the inconsistency of the Marshallian theory of partial equilibrium, according to which, in competition for each good:

1. The equilibrium price is determined by the intersection of the demand curve and that of the supply. The supply curve is symmetrical to that of the demand.
2. As the quantity produced by the firm increases, there are initially increasing returns and, beyond a certain point, decreasing returns.

Sraffa notes that the law of decreasing returns and that of increasing returns have different origins and areas of application (and therefore cannot explain the shape of the same supply curve): the law of diminishing returns was originally applied to the entire economy and resulted from the scarcity of the agricultural land as a mean of production (the rent theory of David Ricardo); while the law of increasing returns applied to the individual firm and resulted from the benefits of division of labour. The first one allowed for the study of the laws of distribution, and the second those of production.

"Nobody, until comparatively recently – Sraffa writes – had thought of unifying these two tendencies in one single law of non-proportional productivity, and considering this as one of the bases of the theory of price" Sraffa observes that the idea of considering the law of non-proportional returns as a basis for the price theory arose, for analogy, only after the study of decreasing utility had drawn attention to the relationship between the price and the quantity consumed. In fact, "if the cost of production of every unit of the commodity under consideration did not vary with variations in quantity produced the symmetry would be broken, the price would be determined exclusively by the expenses of production and demand would be unable to have any influence on it at all".

The difficulties of the system that could, in short, be defined as the cross of the supply and demand curves firstly depend on the heterogeneity of the assumptions on which these two different tendencies are based. Decreasing returns and increasing costs are caused by the limited availability of some input which prevents all inputs from varying in optimal proportion. In other words, if an input is limited in quantity, a rise in production levels brings about a less efficient proportion among inputs with a fall in productivity. By contrast, the tendency toward decreasing costs stems from variations in the quantity of all inputs, and therefore they may occur only when there are no constant factors.

A second difficulty stems from the fact that, as Sraffa notes, in the neoclassical theory of prices the equilibrium of the individual firm is determined on the basis of cost variations deriving from small increases in its production (marginalist theory) and taking the situation unchanged in other companies of the same industry and the entire economy, following the hypothesis of ceteris paribus, i.e. other conditions being equal.

Sraffa highlights that the possibility of applying the hypothesis of increasing costs to the supply curve is limited to the rare cases in which a considerable part of the supply of input is employed for the production of only one commodity. However, in general, each input is employed by a certain number of industries that produce different goods.

As for increasing returns and decreasing costs, Marshall himself notes that external economies can hardly be attributed clearly to a specific industry, but they are of considerable interest to groups, often of a large size, in related industries; consequently, it is not possible to hypothesize an increase in returns in just one company.

If in the partial equilibrium system of competitive prices, it is not possible to consider decreasing or increasing costs without contradicting the nature of the system, it follows, from this point of view, that production costs of goods produced in competition must be regarded as constant in respect of small variations in the quantity produced" and that the long-run supply curve of an industry is horizontal. As a consequence, the price and the quantity of a good do not derive from the simultaneous action of the supply and demand curves: the price is determined by production costs, while the quantity produced is determined by the demand. The neoclassical symmetry between demand and supply is broken. The old theory that, in competition, "makes the value of commodities dependent on the cost of production alone appears to hold its ground as the best available" (1926b:540–41).

Finally, Sraffa remarks that "everyday experience shows that the majority of which produce manufactured consumers' goods operate in conditions of individual diminishing costs. If the limit to the firm's expansion does not arise from increasing costs, then it may arise from the difficulty in expanding the market share without changing any of these three aspects: improving the quality of the output, reducing its price, or increasing marketing expenses. These considerations were developed, in the 1930s, by the theory of imperfect competition.

=== Cambridge years ===
In 1927, Sraffa's yet undiscussed theory of value, but also his friendship with Antonio Gramsci—a risky and compromising endeavour in the context of the Italian fascist regime—brought John Maynard Keynes to invite Sraffa to the University of Cambridge, where the Italian economist was initially assigned a lectureship.

Sraffa arrived in July 1927 and remained there for life. In the shelter of the English city, he held courses about advanced value theory in his first three years. Then, again with the help of Keynes, he held a librarian position and could devote himself to study, intertwining relationships with a series of intellectuals destined to leave remarkable and lasting tracks.

Together with Frank P. Ramsey and Ludwig Wittgenstein, Sraffa joined the so-called cafeteria group, an informal club that discussed Keynes's theory of probability and Friedrich Hayek's theory of business cycles (see Sraffa–Hayek debate).

The economists that should at least be remembered are Michał Kalecki (1899–1970), Maurice Dobb (1900–1976), Joan Robinson (1903–1983) and Nicholas Kaldor (1908–1986). Among the philosophers, Frank Plumpton Ramsey (1903–1930) was helpful during the initial elaboration of the equations, datable in 1928, of the book Production of Commodities by Means of Commodities, which was published in 1960.

In the early thirties there was a controversy between Sraffa and Friedrich von Hayek, who published a criticism of Keynes's conclusions contained in A Treatise on Money (1930). After a first reply, Keynes asked Sraffa about writing a more detailed answer to Hayek's theses. Sraffa thoroughly analyzed the inconsistencies in the logic of Hayek's theory on the effect of forced capital savings caused by inflation and above all on the definition of natural interest rate. The debate continued with a reply by Hayek and a rejoinder by Sraffa.

In 1939, Sraffa was elected to a fellowship at Trinity College. Luigi Pasinetti identifies five stages of his work in Cambridge.

1. 1928–1931: research on the history of economic theories, aimed at recovering the "reasonable" economics of the classics. Sraffa intends to "go straight to the unknown, from Marshall to Marx, from disutility to material cost ".
2. 1931–1940: edition of David Ricardo's works; almost ready for printing, they don't get published, both because the "Introduction" (written by Sraffa later) is missing, and because of the discovery of new documents, including all Ricardo's letters to James Mill.
3. 1941–1945: criticism of neoclassical economics, in particular of the theory of production and distribution of the theory of value (of prices), of the theory of marginal utility and of the theory of interest as a reward for abstinence; processing of his equations with surplus.
4. 1946–1955: publication of the first ten volumes of Ricardo's works (the eleventh, containing the General Index, will be published in 1973). John Eatwell wrote of Sraffa's work on David Ricardo:
  [Sraffa's] reconstruction of Ricardo's surplus theory, presented in but a few pages of the introduction to his edition of Ricardo's Principles, penetrated a hundred years of misunderstanding and distortion to create a vivid rationale for the structure and content of the surplus theory, for the analytical role of the labour theory of value, and hence for the foundations of Marx's critical analysis of capitalist production.
5. 1955–1960: preparation of Production of Goods by Means of Goods as mere "premise to a critique of political economy". The original project proved however too vast: of the historical part remains only an appendix of a few pages entitled "Note on the sources". In the Preface, Sraffa expresses his hope that the real criticism will be attempted "later, or by the author or someone younger and better equipped for the company".

=== Production of Commodities by Means of Commodities ===
The critique of neo-classical price theory based on the relations between cost and quantity produced leads Sraffa to abandon the analysis of partial equilibrium. Since the late 1920s, he began to work on a price theory that takes up the classical concepts of reproducibility, surplus, circularity of production, and freedom of entry. In his book, Production of Commodities by Means of Commodities, published only in 1960, Sraffa focuses on the analysis of relative prices and income distribution, assuming "no changes in output and ... no changes in the proportions in which different means of production are used ..., so that no question arises as to the variation or constancy of returns". As in classics, in Sraffa's 1960 book, relative prices are determined by the conditions of production and not on the basis of the functional connection between returns and quantity produced.

Sraffa's Production of Commodities by Means of Commodities is proposed to perfect classical economics' theory of value as originally developed by Ricardo and others. He aimed to demonstrate flaws in the mainstream neoclassical theory of value and develop an alternative analysis.

In this important work, Sraffa analyzes a linear production model in which it is possible to determine the relative price structure and one of the two distributive variables (rate of profit or wage), exogenously given the other and the technology. The value of the capital employed can be known only together with the prices of the goods from which it is made. In essence, Sraffa shows that:

1. It is not possible to identify a law that simultaneously determines the wage and the rate of profit because: i) the rate of profit can only be determined by setting the wage (or vice versa); ii) it is impossible to measure capital without also determining prices (including the profit), so it is not possible to calculate the profit based on the value of capital (as its remuneration).
2. It cannot be assumed that, as wages increase, labour is replaced by capital, as the value of the capital depends on the duration of the initial investment; considering capitals of different duration, it may well happen that we prefer to replace capital with labour even if wages decrease (so-called "capital-reversing", which is related to the "return of techniques"); consequently, unemployment cannot be attributed to the increase in wages.

Sraffa's technique of aggregating capital as "dated inputs of labour" led to a debate known as the Cambridge capital controversy.

Sraffa's analytical apparatus was used by some followers for the solution to the Marxian problem of transforming values into prices of production and for the criticism of the Marxian theory of value. Moreover, as highlighted by Pasinetti, Sraffa's analysis overcomes the limits of the input-output system of Wassily Leontief, in particular with regard to the effects of technical change. Pasinetti's approach, based on Sraffa's theory, has recently been developed by Kurz and Salvadori.

Economists disagree on whether Sraffa's work refutes neoclassical economics. Many post-Keynesian economists use Sraffa's critique as justification for abandoning neoclassical analysis and exploring other models of economic behaviour. Others see his work as compatible with neoclassical economics as developed in modern general equilibrium models, or as unable to determine a long-period position, just like the Walrasian approach. Others still argue that the importance of Sraffa's economics is that it provides a new framing for how we understand capitalist economies that do not fall back on the arguably unrealistic assumptions of neoclassical economics.

Nonetheless, Sraffa's work, particularly his interpretation of Ricardo and his Production of Commodities by Means of Commodities (1960), is seen as the starting point of the neo-Ricardian school in the 1960s.

== Personal connections ==
Sraffa was instrumental in securing Gramsci's prison notebooks from the Fascist authorities after the latter's death in 1937. In 1924, Gramsci published a letter from Sraffa "Problems of Today and of Tomorrow", Gramsci published 1924 a letter from Sraffa (without signing, signed S.). In the letter, Sraffa emphasizes the function of bourgeois opposition in the struggle against fascism and the importance of democratic institutions for the social and political development of the proletariat. Seeing the Italian Communist Party as weak, Sraffa recommended collaboration with the bourgeois opposition to fascism. In his answer, Gramsci rejected this suggestion, but he followed Sraffa's advice several years later.

Norman Malcolm famously credits Sraffa with providing Ludwig Wittgenstein with the conceptual break that founded the Philosophical Investigations, by means of a rude gesture on Sraffa's part:

Wittgenstein was insisting that a proposition and what it describes must have the same 'logical form', the same 'logical multiplicity'. Sraffa made a gesture, familiar to Neapolitans as meaning something like disgust or contempt, of brushing the underneath of his chin with an outward sweep of the fingertips of one hand. And he asked: 'What is the logical form of that?'

In the introduction to Philosophical Investigations, Wittgenstein mentions discussions with Sraffa over many years and says: "I am indebted to this stimulus for the most consequential ideas in this book". However, Sraffa broke off his weekly conversations with Wittgenstein in 1946 despite the latter's protests; and when the philosopher said he would talk about anything Sraffa wanted, "'Yes', Sraffa replied, 'but in your way'".

Sraffa and Wittgenstein influenced each other deeply. While Wittgenstein made his famous turn from the Tractatus Logico-Philosophicus to the Philosophical Investigations wherein he jettisoned the previous idea that the world comprised an atomistic set of propositional facts for the notion that meaning derives from its use within a holistic self-enclosed system. Analogously, Sraffa was rebutting the neoclassical paradigm which was similarly atomistic and individualistic. While there are disputes about how to interpret Sraffa, none dispute Sraffa's influence.

After the publication of Production of Commodities by Means of Commodities, Sraffa's thought became the subject of a great debate. Sraffa was described as a shy and very reserved man who was devoted to study and books. His library contained more than 8,000 volumes, many of which are now in the Trinity College Library. A popular anecdote claims that Sraffa made successful long-term investments in Japanese government bonds that he bought the day after the nuclear bombing on Hiroshima and Nagasaki. Another version of this is that Sraffa bought the bonds during the war when they were trading at distressed prices as he was convinced that Japan would honour its obligations (Nicholas Kaldor, pp. 66–67). Records of Sraffa's investments in his Trinity College papers show that he had in fact begun his purchasing in 1946, during post-war debates over whether Japan would repay its external pre-war debts to return to normality; his modelled returns were large and Lonergan calculates that Sraffa likely realized an estimated annual return of 16% per annum from 1946 to 1983.

In 1961, before the Sveriges Riksbank Prize in Economic Sciences in Memory of Alfred Nobel had been created, he was awarded the Söderströmska Gold Medal by the Royal Swedish Academy of Science. In 1972, he was awarded an honorary doctorate by Sorbonne and in 1976 received another one from Madrid's Complutense university.

Sraffa was involved in Cambridge capital controversy, sometimes called "the capital controversy". It was a debate between prominent economists such as Joan Robinson and Piero Sraffa at the University of Cambridge in England and economists such as Paul Samuelson and Robert Solow at the Massachusetts Institute of Technology, in Cambridge, Massachusetts, United States.

In 1966, Paul Samuelson organized a symposium in the QJE, in which it was accepted by all parties, including Samuelson himself, that David Levhari had made a mistake and that Sraffa's proposition is, of course, robust. The proposition in question refuted the Clarkian-type neoclassical explanation of the rate of interest on capital on the basis of the "marginal productivity of capital," which requires measurement of the "intensity" of capital independently of the rate of interest. Sraffa's "re-switching" proposition showed that, in general, there is no logical way by which the "intensity of capital" can be measured independently of the rate of interest – and hence the widely held neoclassical explanation of the distribution of income was logically untenable. This victory was well-known as the pinnacle of Sraffa's book.

== Principal works ==
- Sraffa, Piero, "Monetary inflation in Italy during and after the war", Cambridge Journal of Economics, Vol. 17, No. 1 (March 1993), pp. 7–26; Engl. translation by W.J. Harcourt and C. Sardoni of "L'inflazione monetaria in Italia durante e dopo la Guerra, Milan, Premiata Scuola Tip. Salesiana, 1920; reprint in Economia Politica, XI, n.2, August 1994, pp. 163–96.
- Sraffa, Piero, "The Bank Crisis in Italy", The Economic Journal, 1922, 36 (126) (June), pp. 178–97.
- Sraffa, Piero, "The current situation of Italian banks", Manchester Guardian Commercial, 1922, 7 December.
- Sraffa, Piero, "Sulle relazioni tra costo e quantità prodotta", Annali di economia, II, 1925, pp. 277–328; English translation by A. Roncaglia and J. Eatwel, "On the relations between cost and quantity produced", in L.L. Pasinetti (ed.), Italian Economic Papers, vol. III, Il Mulino – Oxford University Press, 1998, pp. 323–63.
- Sraffa, Piero, 1926, "The Laws of Returns under Competitive Conditions", Economic Journal, 36(144), pp. 535–50. JSTOR 2959866
- DH Robertson, Piero Sraffa and GF Shove, "Increasing Returns and the Representative Firm ", The Economic Journal, Vol. 40, No. 157 (March 1930), pp. 79–116.
- Piero Sraffa and L. Einaudi, "An Alleged Correction of Ricardo", The Quarterly Journal of Economics, Vol. 44, No. 3 (May 1930), pp. 539–45
- Sraffa, Piero, "Dr. Hayek on Money and Capital", The Economic Journal, 1932, 42: 42–53.
- Sraffa, Piero, "A Rejoinder", The Economic Journal, 1932, 42 (June): 249–51.
- Sraffa, Piero, "Malthus on Public Works", The Economic Journal, 1955, 259 (Sept.): 543–44.
- Sraffa, Piero, "Introduction to David Ricardo", Works and Correspondence, in P. Sraffa and M. H. Dobb, Cambridge University Press, Cambridge, 1951–1955 (vols. IX) and 1973 (vol. XI, indexes), vol. I: pp. xiii–lxiii.
- Sraffa, Piero, 1960, Production of Commodities by Means of Commodities: Prelude to a Critique of Economic Theory. Cambridge University Press. Preview.
- Sraffa, Piero, "Production of Commodities: A Comment", The Economic Journal, 1962, 286 (June): 477–479.
- Sraffa, Piero and M.H. Dobb, editors (1951–1973). The Works and Correspondence of David Ricardo. Cambridge University Press, 11 vols. Online at the Online Library of Liberty.
