= Cafeteria Group =

Informal group of notable economists

The "cafeteria group" was an informal club at the University of Cambridge consisting of John Maynard Keynes, Frank P. Ramsey, Piero Sraffa and Ludwig Wittgenstein. The group discussed Keynes's theory of probability, particularly his 1921 A Treatise on Probability, and Friedrich Hayek's theory of business cycles.

== See also ==
- Austrian Theory of the Business Cycle
- A Treatise on Probability
- Keynesian economics
- Probability theory
