= Frances Baker =

British painter (1873–1944)

- Born: Frances Davies-Colley; 3 May 1873; London, United Kingdom
- Died: 14 November 1944 (aged 71); Cambridge, United Kingdom
- Known for: Genre and Portrait Painting
- Spouses: Cecil Cautley Baker (m. 1897; died 1903) Francis Kennedy Cahill (m. 1915; died 1930)

Frances Baker (3 May 1873 – 14 November 1944), also known professionally as Frances Cahill, was a British painter who was active in Ireland in the early years of the 20th century.

== Biography ==
Frances Davies-Colley was born into a prominent family of medical professionals: her father, John Neville Davies-Colley, was chief surgeon at Guy's Hospital, London, her brothers, Robert Davies-Colley and Hugh Davies-Colley, also became surgeons at Guy's, and her sister, Eleanor Davies-Colley, was the founder of the South London Hospital for Women and Children and the first woman elected to the Royal College of Surgeons.

Frances, the eldest child, studied at the Slade School of Art, taking a certificate in figure drawing in the 1894-95 session. She married Cecil Cautley Baker in 1897; a surveyor by profession, he had taken first prize honors at the Royal Agricultural College in 1877 and passed the professional examination of the Institution of Surveyors in 1885. The couple had two daughters: Lettice Cautley Baker (later Ramsey), born in Guildford, Surrey, England in 1898; and Frances Cautley Baker (later Trench; later Farrell), born in Thakeham, Sussex, England in 1902. The family moved to Rosses Point, County Sligo, where Cecil Baker leased oyster farming rights in the Sligo estuary. He died suddenly in 1903, and his widow and young family moved to Ballysadare, where Frances had a farm, worked as a photographer and continued painting.

Working both in oil and watercolor, producing portraits and landscapes, Baker exhibited regularly with George William Russell (AE). In Dublin, Baker was acquainted with Irish activists and artists including Constance Gore-Booth and her second husband Casimir Dunin Markievicz. She exhibited paintings in a joint show at the Leinster Lecture Hall in 1911 with Markievicz, Russell, and Paul and Grace Henry. She also showed work in exhibitions at the Royal Hibernian Academy, Dublin, and the Royal Institute of Oil Painters.

Frances Baker married a second time in 1915 to Dublin physician Francis Kennedy Cahill. Her husband was active in amateur theatrical circles, and they were involved with the United Arts Club in Dublin.

In 1919, she opened a textile weaving workshop called the Crock of Gold in Dublin. The firm became well known as part of the craft revival of handwork and exhibited at the Irish Decorative Art Association exhibitions pre-Partition and the Arts and Crafts Society shows throughout the late 1920s and early 1930s. As with other successful handcrafting businesses at the time, the firm’s traditional handmade textiles sold to modern fashion designers, including French designer Coco Chanel. Baker's daughter Frances and her husband, the writer Michael Farrell, later managed the highly successful business.

Baker's second husband Dr Francis Kennedy Cahill died suddenly in 1930 in Dublin, while Baker was in England attending the funeral of her son-in-law, the Cambridge mathematician Frank P. Ramsey. Baker lived in France for a time but settled in Cambridge by the late 1930s. She died in Cambridge in November 1944.

== Paintings ==
After her second marriage, Baker was known as Mrs Kennedy Cahill and Frances Cahill; she signed her work with the initials “FB” and “FC.”

- Lettice, Newnham College
- Loading the Turf Cart (aka Gathering the Turf) (pastel on tinted paper, 30.5 x 43 cm)
- Driving Cattle (aka Bringing Home the Cows) (pastel on tinted paper, 30.5 x 43 cm)
- Ox Mountain Co Sligo (watercolour and pencil, 24 x 34 cm)
- Peasants Working before a Cottage (watercolour and pencil, 29 x 39.5 cm)
- Self Portrait, 1900 (pencil, heightened with white; waxed crayon, 33 x 23.5 cm)
- Self Portrait, 1917 (pencil, heightened with white; waxed crayon, 28.5 x 21.5 cm)
- Cafe Scenes, Spalato Croatia (pencil, 20.5 x 27 cm)
- A Park in Paris (watercolour, 23 x 30.5 cm)
- Fontaine De L'Observatoire, Paris, 1933 (watercolour and pencil, 23 x 26 cm)
- Irish Cottage Interior with Family Group, 1904 (watercolour and pencil, 18 x 26 cm)
- Irish Landscape (oil on canvas, 49.5 x 60 cm)
- Lettice Reading and Frances Knitting, 1914 (oil on canvas, 62.25 x 53.5 cm)
- Market Day, Co Sligo (watercolour and pen heightened with white, 21.5 x 29 cm)
- Market Stalls on the Left Bank, Paris (watercolour, 23 x 31.75 cm)
- Meadow (watercolour, 25.5 cm x 35.5 cm)
- Morning, Place Montrouge, 1933 (watercolour and pencil heightened with white, 13 x 19 cm)
- Portrait of Cecil Baker (oil on canvas, 59 x 49.5 cm)
- Portrait of Mrs. George Russell (oil on canvas, 76 x 61 cm)
- River Scene with Trees on the Far Bank (watercolour and pencil, 20.5 x 39 cm)
- Self Portrait (oil on board, 34 x 23.5 cm)
- Self Portrait (oil on canvas, 75.5 x 63.5 cm)
- Self Portrait, 1895 (oil on canvas, 43 x 32.5 cm)
- Women Digging Potatoes, Co Sligo, 1905 (watercolour and pencil heightened with white, 32.5 x 42 cm)
