= Michael Farrell =

Michael Farrell may refer to:

- Mike Farrell (born 1939), American actor
- Mike Farrell (athlete) (born 1933), British middle-distance runner
- Michael James Farrell (1926–1975), British economist
- Michael Farrell (activist) (born 1944), Northern Irish civil rights activist
- Michael Farrell (cricketer) (born 1968), Australian cricketer
- Michael Farrell (footballer) (1902–?), Irish footballer
- Michael W. Farrell (born 1938), Senior Judge of the District of Columbia Court of Appeals
- Mike Farrell (ice hockey) (born 1978), retired American ice hockey defenseman
- Michael Farrell (musician), keyboardist and songwriter
- Michael Farrell (poet) (born 1965), Australian poet
- Michael Farrell (powerlifter) (born 1962), Australian Paralympian
- Mike Farrell (speedway rider) (born 1955), Australian speedway rider
- Michael Farrell (Irish writer) (1899–1962), Irish writer and broadcaster

== See also ==
- Micheal Farrell (1940–2000), Irish artist
