= History of type =

History of type may refer to:

- History of printing in typography
- History of type theory in mathematics
