= Picture theory of language =

Linguistic theory

The picture theory of language, also known as the picture theory of meaning, is a theory of linguistic reference and meaning articulated by Ludwig Wittgenstein in the Tractatus Logico-Philosophicus. Wittgenstein suggested that a meaningful proposition pictured a state of affairs or atomic fact. Wittgenstein compared the concept of logical pictures (German: Bilder) with spatial pictures. The picture theory of language originated from Russell's correspondence theory of truth.

Wittgenstein claims there is an unbridgeable gap between what can be expressed in language and what can only be expressed in non-verbal ways. The picture theory of meaning states that statements are meaningful if, and only if, they can picture a possible state of affairs.

Wittgenstein's later investigations laid out in the First Part of Philosophical Investigations refuted and replaced his earlier picture-based theory with a use theory of meaning. However, the second psychology-focused Part of Philosophical Investigations employs the concept as a metaphor for human psychology.

== See also ==
- Early Wittgenstein
- Truth-conditional semantics
