= Lettice Ramsey =

British photographer

- Portrait of Lettice Ramsey by PAL Brunney
- Born: 2 August 1898; Guildford, Surrey, England
- Died: 12 July 1985 (aged 86); Cambridge, United Kingdom
- Education: Newnham College, Cambridge
- Known for: photography
- Spouse: Frank P. Ramsey

Lettice Ramsey (2 August 1898 – 12 July 1985) was a British photographer.

== Life ==
Lettice Cautley Baker was born on 2 August 1898 in Guildford, Surrey, England. Her father Cecil was a surveyor and her mother Frances (née Davies-Colley) was a painter, trained at the Slade. The Baker family moved to County Sligo, Ireland, soon after Lettice's birth, where Cecil Baker had leased rights to oyster farming in the estuary near Rosses Point. Ramsey's father died when she was a small child; her mother remarried in 1915. She attended Bedales, then Newnham College, Cambridge, where she studied philosophy. After working for a brief time in vocational guidance in London, she returned to Cambridge to work in the Psychology Library. In 1925, she married mathematician Frank P. Ramsey, and they had two daughters before his early death in 1930 from liver disease.

To support her family, Ramsey took a photography course at Regent Street Polytechnic. Introduced to photographer Helen Muspratt by artist F. H. "Fra" Newbery, the two women opened a studio together in Cambridge in 1932.

Lettice Ramsey died on 12 July 1985 in Cambridge, England.

== Work ==
The photography studio, Ramsey & Muspratt, was a successful commercial venture, and the pair photographed influential social, academic, and artistic figures in Cambridge throughout the 1930s. Muspratt moved to Oxford in 1937 and opened a second studio there; Ramsey maintained the studio in Cambridge, and both retained the Ramsey & Muspratt studio name. They remained close throughout their lives. In the 1930s, the Ramsey & Muspratt studio was noted for using the solarization process in some portrait work; two of the firm's photographs were accepted in the London Salon of Photography in both 1936 and 1937. While Ramsey's Cambridge work was primarily portraiture, she photographed on her travels, including Russia in 1933, an around-the-world trip in 1948, and later travel to Nepal, Australia, New Zealand, Fiji and Mexico. She visited Cambodia in the late 1960s.

Fourteen of Ramsey's portraits of the Bloomsbury Group were published in a calendar by the Charleston Trust in 1990. In 2012–2013, the National Portrait Gallery, London presented an exhibition of Ramsey & Muspratt work exploring Ramsey's friendship with the Bloomsbury Group poet Julian Bell.

Ramsey retired in 1978.
