= Sraffa–Hayek debate =

1930s debate in economics

The Sraffa–Hayek debate was a debate between economists Piero Sraffa and Friedrich Hayek in the 1930s.

== History ==
In 1931, Hayek critiqued John Maynard Keynes's Treatise on Money (1930) in his "Reflections on the pure theory of Mr. J. M. Keynes" and published his lectures at the LSE in book form as Prices and Production. Keynes replied to Hayek.

After this, Keynes asked Sraffa to write a critical review of Prices and Production for The Economic Journal. Sraffa elaborated on the logical inconsistencies of Hayek's argument, especially concerning the effect of inflation-induced "forced savings" on the capital sector and about the definition of a "natural" interest rate in a growing economy.

In Prices and Production, Hayek argues that monetary factors have a significant influence on production volume and direction. He aims to reconcile traditional marginalist theory with the complexities of reality by analyzing the dynamics of disequilibrium caused by monetary disturbances. Hayek focuses on situations where the monetary interest rate deviates from the natural rate, as defined by Wicksell, and examines the effects of these perturbations on relative prices of consumption and producer goods. His analysis rests on the concept of the average period of production, developed by Böhm-Bawerk, and the proposition that capital intensity in production processes decreases as the interest rate rises. Hayek highlights the role of forced saving resulting from the deviation of the market interest rate from the natural rate. He argues that capital accumulated during the upswing of the business cycle is subsequently destroyed during the downswing, ultimately restoring the economy to its original equilibrium. Hayek argues that policies aimed at stimulating demand for consumption goods, as advocated by under-consumption theories (including Keynesian theory), are counterproductive. Active anti-cyclical interventions only postpone the adjustment to full employment equilibrium.

Sraffa criticizes Hayek's argument, pointing out that it fails to consider certain features specific to a monetary economy, where money serves as a means of payment, unit of measurement in contracts, and store of value. Inflation and monetary policy impact income distribution, and in the presence of debts, money contracts, wage agreements, and rigid prices, the accumulation of capital through forced saving may not be economically destroyed. Instead, it may lead to a new equilibrium state in the economic system.

Hayek's response and Sraffa's rejoinder was published after this.

== Reception ==
Glasner and Zimmerman deconstructs Sraffa's analysis of own rates, arguing his critique was ultimately flawed. Drawing on Irving Fisher's analysis distinguishing real and nominal interest rates, it shows that while nominal own rates may diverge based on expectations of appreciation or depreciation, the real own rates would tend to be equalized by arbitrage across assets. This unique real own rate corresponds to Hayek's conception of the natural rate. Glasner and Zimmerman highlights that Keynes's analysis of own rates in Chapter 17 of the General Theory provided the analytical tools that Hayek could have used to refute Sraffa's claims of incoherence by showing the tendency for real returns to equalize across assets. Yet Hayek failed to mount an effective defense, seeming to concede the existence of multiple natural rates in his reply to Sraffa, which Sraffa correctly identified as nonsensical or unresponsive. Glasner and Zimmerman argues this ineffectual response was a missed opportunity, as a better grasp of Keynes's Chapter 17 could have shown the coherence of Hayek's natural rate idea. They discusses potential reasons for Hayek's struggles, including his adherence to a unique nominal natural rate despite his own analysis suggesting multiple nominal rates could be consistent with neutral money if price expectations aligned. His advocacy of contractionary policies during the Great Depression also contradicted the total spending criterion from his own work.
