= Maev Kennedy =

Irish journalist (born 1954)

- Born: 1954 (age 71–72); Dublin, Ireland
- Education: University College Dublin
- Occupation: Journalist
- Parents: Maurice Kennedy (father); Val Mulkerns (mother)

Maev Kennedy (born 1954) is an Irish journalist. She has worked as a staff news writer for The Irish Times, where she wrote the Dail (parliament) sketch, and for The Guardian. She has been a columnist for the Museums Journal and is a regular contributor to the Art Newspaper. At The Guardian, she edited the diary column, and was arts and heritage correspondent.

== Biography ==
Kennedy's mother was the novelist Val Mulkerns, herself the daughter of the Irish revolutionary Jimmy (J.J.) Mulkerns, who was interned for his involvement in the Four Courts explosion during the Easter Rising in 1916. Her father, Maurice Kennedy, was a short story writer. Their daughter was born in Dublin and attended University College Dublin (UCD), before joining The Irish Times, where she became the newspaper's parliamentary sketch writer.

== Career ==
Kennedy is the author of the Hamlyn History of Archaeology. She broadcasts for the BBC, regularly presenting the Open Book programme on BBC Radio 4 and contributed to the Saturday Review programme. She is a Fellow of the Society of Antiquaries of London.

== Bibliography ==
- The History of Archaeology (1998) ISBN 1-84100-311-5
- Hamlyn History of Archaeology (Spanish edition) (1998) ISBN 0-600-59417-3
