= Wittgenstein Tractatus =

- Directed by: Péter Forgács
- Release date: 1992
- Country: Hungary
- Language: Hungarian

Wittgenstein Tractatus is a 1992 short film made by the Hungarian filmmaker Péter Forgács. It features quotes from the Tractatus and other works by Ludwig Wittgenstein alongside images of daily life.

The film runs for 32 minutes.
