= The Bell (magazine) =

Irish literary magazine (1940–1954)

The Bell was an Irish monthly magazine of literature and social comment, published from 1940 to 1954.

The Bell, vol. XII, No. 6, Sept. 1946

== History ==
The Bell was founded in 1940 by Seán Ó Faoláin. Amongst the contributors to its first edition in 1940 were Elizabeth Bowen, Flann O'Brien, Patrick Kavanagh, Frank O'Connor, and Jack B. Yeats.

The Bell was notable, particularly under the editorship of Seán Ó Faoláin, as an outspoken liberal voice at a time of political and intellectual stagnation, fiercely critical of censorship, Gaelic revivalist ideology, clericalism, and general parochialism.

Under Peadar O'Donnell (1946–54), The Bell became more left‐wing in content and irregular in frequency of publication but continued to produce material of high quality. W. R. Rodgers and Louis MacNeice were among the authors whose work sustained the magazine's connection with cultural activities in Ulster, in addition to which it repeatedly featured writing from various parts of Europe. In the course of its fourteen-year career, The Bell was variously subtitled "A Survey of Irish Life", "A Magazine of Creative Fiction", and "A Magazine of Ireland Today"; its concern with social and political matters gave rise to incisive commentaries on such topics as state censorship in Ireland, on which George Bernard Shaw wrote in an issue of 1945, the restrictive influence of the Church, and reactionary tendencies in Irish literature.

Having undergone financial difficulties which resulted in its temporary closure between 1948 and 1950, it finally ceased appearing in 1954. Along with The Dublin Magazine, The Bell is accounted the most important literary and intellectual journal of Ireland in the twentieth century.

== Contributors ==
The Bell was notable as an outlet for new writers such as Michael McLaverty and James Plunkett. The Bell also fostered many young Irish writers and artists from the 1940s and 1950s, when contributors included Anthony Cronin (who went on to edit the magazine), John Montague, Thomas Kinsella, Val Mulkerns, Brendan Behan, Patrick Kavanagh, Patrick Swift, Michael Farrell (under the pseudonym "Gulliver") and Conor Cruise O'Brien. Musicians such as Brian Boydell and Aloys Fleischmann also contributed.

== Sources and further reading ==
- James Plunket Obituary, The Guardian
- Peadar O'Donnell. Archive.
- Irish Times. When Anthony Cronin was editor.
- The Bell Index , searchable database compiled at Framingham State University, USA, and placed with open access on its website providing the title and author of every item published between 1954 and 1940
