= Val Mulkerns =

Irish writer and journalist

- Born: 14 February 1925; Dublin, Ireland
- Died: 10 March 2018 (aged 93)
- Occupation: Writer
- Writing career
- Genre: Irish literature

Val Mulkerns (14 February 1925 – 10 March 2018) was an Irish writer and member of Aosdána. Her first novel, A Time Outworn, was released to critical acclaim in Ireland in 1952, followed by a series of novels and short stories in the 1970s and 1980s. Mulkerns continued to publish until she died. She also worked as a journalist and columnist and was often heard on the radio.

== Early life ==
Mulkerns was born in Dublin in 1925 to James Mulkerns and Esther O'Neill. She was educated at the Dominican school at Eccles Street, and grew up in an artistic family, her father being a Dublin strolling player and writer of satirical verse.

After a period in the Irish Civil Service, she moved to England, where she worked as a teacher. Hiking around Connemara on holiday in 1951, she met, by chance, the novelist Kate O'Brien. The experience encouraged Mulkerns to return to Ireland. After moving back to Ireland, she began to write, and worked as an associate editor and theatre critic of The Bell, a famed Irish literary review founded by Seán Ó Faoláin and Peadar O'Donnell.

== Works ==
Her two early novels were A Time Outworn (1951), and A Peacock Cry (1954). While taking time off from her fiction career to raise a family in the decade that followed, she was a journalist and columnist with the Irish national newspaper the Evening Press from 1963 to 1983.

In 1978, Mulkerns wrote Antiquities (André Deutsch), the first of three acclaimed collections of short stories. The others were An Idle Woman (Poolbeg, 1980), and A Friend of Don Juan (John Murray, 1988). Two novels followed, The Summerhouse (John Murray, 1984) and Very Like A Whale (John Murray 1986). She wrote two children's books, which have been translated into German and published by Benziger of Zurich.

Mulkerns was joint winner of the AIB Prize for Literature in 1984 and became the Mayo County Library's first writer-in-residence in 1987–1988. During this time, she edited an anthology entitled New Writings from the West. She is included in several key Irish literature anthologies, including The Field Day Anthology (Edited by Seamus Deane), and The Penguin Book of Irish Fiction (edited by Colm Tóibín). She was also included in The Granta Book of The Irish Short Story edited by Irish author Anne Enright. In 2014, a third edition of The Summerhouse was published by Tara Press. A new collection of her short fiction, entitled Memory and Desire, was published in May 2016 by 451 Editions. Her memoir Friends with the Enemy, also published by 451 Editions in December 2017, was her last work.

Anne Enright, writing in The Irish Times, summed up Mulkerns' thus: "It was not easy being a liberalising voice in the Ireland of the day, but Mulkerns wrote like a fighter. Her short stories looked for the angle, and took the shot".

== Later life ==
Mulkerns was married to the writer Maurice Kennedy, and edited a posthumous collection of his work, The Way to Vladivostok, in 2000. The couple were the parents of the journalist Maev Kennedy. She lived outside Dublin, and frequently broadcast on Sunday Miscellany, a programme of writers’ original reflections on RTÉ.

She was passionately involved in campaigns to protect Dublin's architectural heritage and, in later years, was actively campaigning for LGBT rights and marriage equality. She strongly wished to repeal the anti-abortion clause in the Irish constitution.
