= Atomic sentence =

Term in logic

In logic and analytic philosophy, an atomic sentence is a type of declarative sentence which is either true or false (may also be referred to as a proposition, statement or truthbearer) and which cannot be broken down into other simpler sentences. For example, "The dog ran" is atomic whereas "The dog ran and the cat hid" is molecular in natural language.

From a logical analysis point of view, the truth of a sentence is determined by only two things:

- the logical form of the sentence.
- the truth of its underlying atomic sentences.

That is to say, for example, that the truth of the sentence "John is Greek and John is happy" is a function of the meaning of "and", and the truth values of the atomic sentences "John is Greek" and "John is happy". However, the truth of an atomic sentence is not a matter that is within the scope of logic itself, but rather whatever art or science the content of the atomic sentence happens to be talking about.

Logic has developed artificial languages, for example sentential calculus and predicate calculus, partly with the purpose of revealing the underlying logic of natural-language statements, the surface grammar of which may conceal the underlying logical structure. In these artificial languages an atomic sentence is a string of symbols which can represent an elementary sentence in a natural language, and it can be defined as follows. In a formal language, a well-formed formula (or wff) is a string of symbols constituted in accordance with the rules of syntax of the language. A term is a variable, an individual constant or an n-place function letter followed by n terms. An atomic formula is a wff consisting of either a sentential letter or an n-place predicate letter followed by n terms. A sentence is a wff in which any variables are bound. An atomic sentence is an atomic formula containing no variables. It follows that an atomic sentence contains no logical connectives, variables, or quantifiers. A sentence consisting of one or more sentences and a logical connective is a compound (or molecular) sentence.

== Examples ==
=== Assumptions ===
In the following examples:

- let F, G, H be predicate letters;
- let a, b, c be individual constants;
- let x, y, z be variables.

=== Atomic sentences ===
These wffs are atomic sentences; they contain no free variables or conjunctions:

- F(a)
- G(a, b)
- H(a, b, c)

=== Atomic formulae ===
These wffs are atomic formulae, but are not sentences (atomic or otherwise) because they include free variables:

- F(x)
- G(a, z)
- H(x, y, z)

=== Compound sentences ===
These wffs are compound sentences. They are sentences, but are not atomic sentences because they are not atomic formulae:

- ∀x (F(x))
- ∃z (G(a, z))
- ∃x ∀y ∃z (H(x, y, z))
- ∀x ∃z (F(x) ∧ G(a, z))
- ∃x ∀y ∃z (G(a, z) ∨ H(x, y, z))

=== Compound formulae ===
These wffs are compound formulae. They are not atomic formulae but are built up from atomic formulae using logical connectives. They are also not sentences because they contain free variables:

- F(x) ∧ G(a, z)
- G(a, z) ∨ H(x, y, z)

== Interpretations ==
A sentence is either true or false under an interpretation which assigns values to the logical variables. We might for example make the following assignments:

Individual constants

- a: Socrates
- b: Plato
- c: Aristotle

Predicates

- Fα: α is sleeping
- Gαβ: α hates β
- Hαβγ: α made β hit γ

Sentential variables

- p: It is raining.

Under this interpretation the sentences discussed above would represent the following English statements:

- p: "It is raining."
- F(a): "Socrates is sleeping."
- H(b, a, c): "Plato made Socrates hit Aristotle."
- ∀x (F(x)): "Everybody is sleeping."
- ∃z (G(a, z)): "Socrates hates somebody."
- ∃x ∀y ∃z (H(x, y, z)): "Somebody made everybody hit somebody." (They may not have all hit the same person z, but they all did so because of the same person x.)
- ∀x ∃z (F(x) ∧ G(a, z)): "Everybody is sleeping and Socrates hates somebody."
- ∃x ∀y ∃z (G(a, z) ∨ H(x, y, z)): "Either Socrates hates somebody or somebody made everybody hit somebody."

== Translating sentences from a natural language into an artificial language ==
Sentences in natural languages can be ambiguous, whereas the languages of the sentential logic and predicate logics are precise. Translation can reveal such ambiguities and express precisely the intended meaning.

For example, take the English sentence “Father Ted married Jack and Jill”. Does this mean Jack married Jill? In translating we might make the following assignments: Individual Constants

- a: Father Ted
- b: Jack
- c: Jill

Predicates:

- Mαβγ: α officiated at the marriage of β to γ

Using these assignments the sentence above could be translated as follows:

- M(a, b, c): Father Ted officiated at the marriage of Jack and Jill.
- ∃x ∃y (M(a, b, x) ∧ M(a, c, y)): Father Ted officiated at the marriage of Jack to somebody and Father Ted officiated at the marriage of Jill to somebody.
- ∃x ∃y (M(x, a, b) ∧ M(y, a, c)): Somebody officiated at the marriage of Father Ted to Jack and somebody officiated at the marriage of Father Ted to Jill.

To establish which is the correct translation of “Father Ted married Jack and Jill”, it would be necessary to ask the speaker exactly what was meant.

== Philosophical significance ==
Atomic sentences are of particular interest in philosophical logic and the theory of truth and, it has been argued, there are corresponding atomic facts.

An atomic sentence (or possibly the meaning of an atomic sentence) is called an elementary proposition by Ludwig Wittgenstein and an atomic proposition by Bertrand Russell:

- 4.2 The sense of a proposition is its agreement and disagreement with possibilities of existence and non-existence of states of affairs. 4.21 The simplest kind of proposition, an elementary proposition, asserts the existence of a state of affairs. — Wittgenstein, Tractatus Logico-Philosophicus.
- A proposition (true or false) asserting an atomic fact is called an atomic proposition. — Russell, "Introduction to Tractatus Logico-Philosophicus"
- See also and especially regarding elementary proposition and atomic proposition as discussed by Russell and Wittgenstein

Note the distinction between an elementary/atomic proposition and an atomic fact.

No atomic sentence can be deduced from (is not entailed by) any other atomic sentence, no two atomic sentences are incompatible, and no sets of atomic sentences are self-contradictory. Wittgenstein made much of this in his Tractatus. If there are any atomic sentences then there must be "atomic facts" which correspond to those that are true, and the conjunction of all true atomic sentences would say all that was the case, i.e., "the world" since, according to Wittgenstein, "The world is all that is the case". (TLP:1). Similarly the set of all sets of atomic sentences corresponds to the set of all possible worlds (all that could be the case).

The T-schema, which embodies the theory of truth proposed by Alfred Tarski, defines the truth of arbitrary sentences from the truth of atomic sentences.

== See also ==
- Logical constant

== Bibliography ==
- Benson Mates, Elementary Logic, Oxford University Press, 1972.
- Elliott Mendelson, Introduction to Mathematical Logic, Van Nostrand Reinhold Company, 1964.
