= Helen Muspratt =

British photographer

- Born: 13 May 1907; Chennai (India)
- Died: 29 July 2001 (aged 94); Brighton
- Occupation: Photographer
- Spouse(s): John Clement Dix Dunman

Helen Margaret Muspratt (13 May 1907 – 29 July 2001) was a British photographer.

== Early life and education ==
Born in Madras, India, to British Army Lieutenant-Colonel Vivian Edward Muspratt and his wife, Lily May, née Hope. She studied photography at Regent Street Polytechnic.

== Photography career ==
Muspratt opened a photography studio in Swanage, Dorset in 1929. In 1932, she met Lettice Ramsey, and together they opened the Ramsey & Muspratt studio in Cambridge.

Early in her career, Muspratt pursued both portraiture (especially of children) and experimental work; her solarization studies were influenced by the American artist Man Ray. Her documentary work included travel to the Soviet Union in 1936 to photograph farmers and villagers along the Volga; upon her return, she joined the Communist Party in Britain. Commissioned by the Left Book Club in 1937, she photographed miners and unemployed labourers in the Rhondda valley in south Wales. In 1937, she opened a second Ramsey & Muspratt studio in Cornmarket Street, Oxford. The Oxford premises of Ramsey & Muspratt had been a studio opened by Walter Benington on behalf of Elliott & Fry. In Oxford, portraiture was the mainstay of her commercial work until her retirement in the 1970s.

In 1976, she held a retrospective exhibition of her work. Wider recognition came with the 1986–87 touring exhibition Women's Photography in Britain and the volume The Other Observers: Women Photographers in Britain-1900 to the present; in 1986, Channel 4 broadcast a documentary series on women photographers that featured Muspratt; she also appeared in the BBC series Women of Our Century in 1990.

== Personal life ==
In 1937, she married Communist Party organiser Jack Dunman.

== Death ==
Muspratt died on 29 July 2001 in Brighton, England.

== Collections ==
Muspratt's work is held in the following permanent collection:

- National Portrait Gallery, London holds fifteen of Muspratt's portrait photographs

== Exhibitions ==
- Pallant House Gallery, Chichester, 2016
- Bodleian Libraries, Oxford, 2020, to mark the donation of Muspratt's archive to the Libraries
