= Michael Farrell (Irish writer) =

Irish writer & broadcaster (1899–1962)

- Born: 1899; Carlow town, Ireland
- Died: 1962 (aged 62–63); Ireland
- Occupations: Writer, broadcaster
- Known for: Writing Thy Tears Might Cease

Michael Farrell (1899–1962) was an Irish writer and broadcaster remembered for his posthumous novel Thy Tears Might Cease.

The second of six children, Michael Farrell was born in Carlow town to a prosperous Catholic shopkeeper, and educated at Knockbeg College and Blackrock College.

During the Irish War of Independence he spent time in Mountjoy Prison and left Trinity College Dublin without graduating. His older brother, Sean O'Farrell, was the commanding officer of the Carlow Brigade of the Irish Republican Army from the brigade's formation until September 1920.

After his time in university, he worked for several years in the Belgian Congo as a Marine Superintendent of Customs, returning to Ireland after managing to sell a ship for a handsome profit. He worked for Radio Éireann and as a journalist. He contributed to The Bell under the pseudonym "Gulliver".

In 1934 Farrell wrote, produced, and directed the silent film Some Say Chance, notable as the screen debut of Maureen O'Hara; his wife Frances did set design and location scouting.

Farrell's magnum opus, Thy Tears Might Cease, is a semi-autobiographical novel set in the Irish revolutionary period. Although the first draft was completed in 1937, it was published only posthumously in 1963, after editing by the poet Monk Gibbon, a close friend of Farrell. Seán Ó Faoláin, editor of The Bell, is quoted as saying that Farrell was “avid to see it printed but terrified to let it go”.

In 2004 Frank Delaney listed Thy Tears Might Cease as amongst his all time top ten Irish novels

== Personal life ==
In 1930 he married designer and businesswoman Frances Cautley Baker, divorced daughter of painter Frances Baker, with whom she ran a textile company in Blackrock, Dublin called the Crock of Gold. The Crock of Gold manufactured wool products, with Frances designing patterns and primarily selling wholesale to fashion houses. The couple settled in Kilmacanogue. In the later part of his life Michael Farrell worked mainly in his wife's business.
