= Frank P. Ramsey =

British philosopher, mathematician and economist (1903–1930)

- Ramsey, c. 1921
- Born: Frank Plumpton Ramsey; 22 February 1903; Cambridge, Cambridgeshire, England
- Died: 19 January 1930 (aged 26); Southwark, London, England
- Spouse: Lettice Ramsey (m. 1925)
- Children: 2

Education
- Education: Trinity College, Cambridge (BA, 1923)
- Academic advisor: John Maynard Keynes

Philosophical work
- Era: 20th-century philosophy
- Region: Western philosophy
- School: Analytic philosophy
- Institutions: King's College, Cambridge
- Doctoral students: Ludwig Wittgenstein
- Main interests: Combinatorics; Philosophy of mathematics; Logic; Metaphysics; Epistemology
- Notable ideas: Theory of simple types; Redundancy theory of truth; Ramsey sentences; Ramsey–Lewis method; Ramsey theory; Ramsey problem; Ramsey–Dvoretzky–Milman phenomenon; Ramsey test; Ramsey's theorem; Ramsey–Cass–Koopmans model; Keynes–Ramsey rule; Bernays–Schönfinkel–Ramsey class

Frank Plumpton Ramsey (/ˈræmzi/; 22 February 1903 – 19 January 1930) was a British philosopher, mathematician, and economist who made major contributions to all three fields before his death at the age of 26. He was a close friend of Ludwig Wittgenstein and, as an undergraduate, translated Wittgenstein's Tractatus Logico-Philosophicus into English. He was also influential in persuading Wittgenstein to return to philosophy and Cambridge University. Like Wittgenstein, he was a member of the Cambridge Apostles, a secret intellectual society at the university, from 1921.

== Life ==
Ramsey was born on 22 February 1903 in Cambridge where his father Arthur Stanley Ramsey (1867–1954), also a mathematician, was President of Magdalene College. His mother was Mary Agnes Stanley (1875–1927). He was the eldest of two brothers and two sisters, and his brother Michael Ramsey, the only one of the four siblings who was to remain Christian, later became Archbishop of Canterbury. He entered Winchester College in 1915 and later returned to Cambridge to study mathematics at Trinity College. There he became a student of John Maynard Keynes and an active member in the Apostles. In 1923, he received his bachelor's degree in mathematics, passing his examinations with the result of first class with distinction, and was named Senior Wrangler (top of his class). Easy-going, simple and modest, Ramsey had many interests besides his mathematical and scientific studies. Even as a teenager, Ramsey exhibited both a profound ability and, as attested by his brother, an extremely diverse range of interests:

He was interested in almost everything. He was immensely widely read in English literature; he was enjoying classics though he was on the verge of plunging into being a mathematical specialist; he was very interested in politics, and well-informed; he had got a political concern and a sort of left-wing caring-for-the-underdog kind of outlook about politics.

— Michael Ramsey, Quoted in Mellor

In 1923, Ramsey was befriended by Geoffrey and Margaret Pyke, then on the point of founding the Malting House School in Cambridge; the Pykes took Ramsey into their family, taking him on holiday and asking him to be the godfather of their young son. Margaret found herself to be the object of his affection, Ramsey recording in his diary:

One afternoon I went out alone with her on Lake Orta and became filled with desire and we came back and lay on two beds side by side she reading, I pretending to, but with an awful conflict in my mind. After about an hour I said (she was wearing her horn spectacles and looking superlatively beautiful in the Burne Jones style) 'Margaret will you fuck with me?'

Margaret wanted time to consider his proposition and thus began an uncomfortable dance between them, which contributed to Ramsey's depressive moods in early 1924; as a result, he travelled to Vienna for psychoanalysis. Like many of his contemporaries, including his Viennese flatmate and fellow Apostle Lionel Penrose (also in analysis with Siegfried Bernfeld), Ramsey was intellectually interested in psychoanalysis. Ramsey's analyst was Theodor Reik, a disciple of Freud. As one of the justifications for undertaking the therapy, he asserted in a letter to his mother that unconscious impulses might affect even a mathematician's work. While in Vienna, he made a trip to Puchberg in order to visit Wittgenstein, was befriended by the Wittgenstein family and visited A.S. Neill's experimental school four hours from Vienna at Sonntagsberg. In the summer of 1924, he continued his analysis by joining Reik at Dobbiaco (in South Tyrol), where a fellow analysand was Lewis Namier. Ramsey returned to England in October 1924; with John Maynard Keynes's support, he became a fellow of King's College, Cambridge. He joined a Psychoanalysis Group in Cambridge with fellow members Arthur Tansley, Lionel Penrose, Harold Jeffreys, John Rickman and James Strachey, the qualification for membership of which was a completed psychoanalysis.

Ramsey married Lettice Baker in August 1925, the wedding taking place in a Register Office since Ramsey was, as his wife described him, a 'militant atheist'. The marriage produced two daughters. After Ramsey's death, Lettice Ramsey opened a photography studio in Cambridge with photographer Helen Muspratt. Despite his atheism, Ramsey was "quite tolerant" towards his brother when the latter decided to become a priest in the Church of England.

In 1926 he became a university lecturer in mathematics and later a Director of Studies in Mathematics at King's College. The Vienna Circle manifesto (1929) lists three of his publications in a bibliography of closely related authors.

== Ramsey and Wittgenstein ==
When I. A. Richards and C. K. Ogden, both Fellows of Magdalene, first met Ramsey, he expressed his interest in learning German. According to Richards, he mastered the language "in almost hardly over a week", although other sources show he had taken one year of German in school. Ramsey was then able, at the age of 19, to make the first draft of the translation of the German text of Ludwig Wittgenstein's Tractatus Logico-Philosophicus. Ramsey was impressed by Wittgenstein's work and after graduating as Senior Wrangler in the Mathematical Tripos of 1923 he submitted a review of the Tractatus to Mind and then made a journey to Austria to discuss the work further. Wittgenstein at that time teaching in a primary school in the small community of Puchberg am Schneeberg. For two weeks Ramsey discussed the difficulties he was facing in understanding the Tractatus. Wittgenstein made some corrections to the English translation in Ramsey's copy and some annotations and changes to the German text that subsequently appeared in the second edition in 1933.

Ramsey and John Maynard Keynes cooperated to try to bring Wittgenstein back to Cambridge (he had been a student there before World War I). Once Wittgenstein had returned to Cambridge, he decided to submit the Tractatus as a doctoral thesis and Ramsey was appointed as his supervisor. As the Tractatus was already completed and published, this was a nominal role. Ramsey did, however—at Wittgenstein's request—fulfil the administrative requirement that every PhD thesis be accompanied by an abstract, by writing one himself. G.E. Moore and Bertrand Russell acted as examiners. Later, the three of them arranged financial aid for Wittgenstein to help him continue his research work.

In 1929 Ramsey and Wittgenstein regularly discussed issues in mathematics and philosophy with Piero Sraffa, an Italian economist who had been brought to Cambridge by Keynes after Sraffa had aroused Benito Mussolini's ire by publishing an article critical of the Fascist regime in the Manchester Guardian. The contributions of Ramsey to these conversations were acknowledged by both Sraffa and Wittgenstein in their later work.

In the introduction to Philosophical Investigations Wittgenstein credits Ramsey's criticism of the Tractatus in the "interminable conversations" they had as having helped him realise "grave mistakes" within the work.

== Early death ==
Suffering chronic liver problems, Ramsey developed jaundice after an abdominal operation and died on 19 January 1930 at Guy's Hospital in London at the age of 26. There is a suspicion that the cause of his death might be an undiagnosed leptospirosis with which Ramsey, an avid swimmer, could have become infected while swimming in the Cam.

He is buried in the Parish of the Ascension Burial Ground in Cambridge; his parents are buried in the same plot.

Ramsey's notes and manuscripts were acquired by Nicholas Rescher for the Archives of Scientific Philosophy at the University of Pittsburgh. This collection contains only a few letters but a great many drafts of papers and book chapters, some still unpublished. Other papers, including his diary and letters and memoirs by his widow Lettice Ramsey and his father, are held in the Modern Archives, King's College, Cambridge.

== Work ==
=== Mathematical logic ===
One of the theorems proved by Ramsey in his 1928 paper On a Problem of Formal Logic now bears his name (Ramsey's theorem). While this theorem is the work Ramsey is probably best remembered for, he proved it only in passing, as a minor lemma along the way to his true goal in the paper, solving a special case of the decision problem for first-order logic, namely the decidability of what is now called the Bernays–Schönfinkel–Ramsey class of first-order logic, as well as a characterisation of the spectrum of sentences in this fragment of logic. Alonzo Church would go on to show that the general case of the decision problem for first-order logic is unsolvable and that first-order logic is undecidable (see Church's theorem). A great amount of later work in mathematics was fruitfully developed out of the ostensibly minor lemma used by Ramsey in his decidability proof: this lemma turned out to be an important early result in combinatorics, supporting the idea that within some sufficiently large systems, however disordered, there must be some order. So fruitful, in fact, was Ramsey's theorem that today there is an entire branch of mathematics, known as Ramsey theory, which is dedicated to studying similar results.

In 1926, Ramsey proposed a simplification of the Theory of Types developed by Bertrand Russell and Alfred North Whitehead in their Principia Mathematica. The resulting theory is known today as Theory of Simple Type (TST) or Simple Type Theory. Ramsey observed that a hierarchy of types was sufficient to deal with mathematical paradoxes, so removed Russell's and Whitehead's ramified hierarchy, which was meant to elude semantic paradoxes. Ramsey's version of the theory is the one considered by Kurt Gödel in the original proof of his first incompleteness theorem. Ramsey's Theory of Simple Types was further simplified by Willard van Orman Quine in his New Foundations for set theory, in which any explicit reference to types is eliminated from the language of the theory.

=== Philosophy ===
His main philosophical works included Universals (1925), Facts and Propositions (1927) (which proposed a redundancy theory of truth), Universals of Law and of Fact (1928), Knowledge (1929), Theories (1929), On Truth (1929), Causal Qualities (1929), and General Propositions and Causality (1929). Ramsey was perhaps the first to propose a reliabilist theory of knowledge. He also produced what philosopher Alan Hájek has described as an "enormously influential version of the subjective interpretation of probability". His thought in this area was outlined in the paper Truth and Probability (discussed below) which was written in 1926 but first published posthumously in 1931.

Following his death in 1930, Ramsey's paper "Universals" (1925) was also published in the compilation of his works, The Foundations of Mathematics (1931). Here Ramsey offered a philosophical rebuttal to conclusions reached by Bertrand Russell regarding, "whether there is a fundamental division of objects into two classes, particulars and universals." After reviewing arguments supporting and rejecting the distinction, Ramsey concluded that "none of these arguments are really decisive...in such cases it is a heuristic maxim that the truth lies not in one of the two disputed views but in some third possibility which has not yet been thought of, which we can only discover by rejecting something assumed as obvious by both the disputants." Through the use of this heuristic maxim, Ramsey further argued that, "that philosophers are very liable to be misled by the subject-predicate construction of our language...that all propositions must be of the subject-predicate form, and so have been led to deny the existence of relations... all philosophers, including Mr Russell himself, have been misled by language in a far more far-reaching way than that... the whole theory of particulars and universals is due to mistaking for a fundamental characteristic of reality what is merely a characteristic of language." Decades later, Lewis White Beck argued that Ramsey's Maxim also played a central role in the resolution of several other philosophical antinomies in the work of Immanuel Kant.

=== Economics ===
Keynes and Pigou encouraged Ramsey to work on economics as "From a very early age, about sixteen I think, his precocious mind was intensely interested in economic problems" (Keynes, 1933). Ramsey responded to Keynes's urging by writing three papers in economic theory all of which were of fundamental importance, though it was many years before they received their proper recognition by the community of economists.

Ramsey's three papers, described below in detail, were on subjective probability and utility (1926), optimal taxation (1927) and optimal growth in a one-sector economy (1928). The economist Paul Samuelson described them in 1970 as "three great legacies – legacies that were for the most part mere by-products of his major interest in the foundations of mathematics and knowledge."

Ramsey's economic views were socialist.

==== Truth and Probability ====
In A Treatise on Probability (1921), Keynes argued against the subjective approach in epistemic probabilities. For Keynes, the subjectivity of probabilities does not matter as much, as for him there is an objective relationship between knowledge and probabilities, as knowledge is disembodied and not personal.

Ramsey disagreed with this approach. In his article "Truth and Probability" (1926), he argued that there is a difference between the notions of probability in physics and in logic. For Ramsey, probability is not related to a disembodied body of knowledge but is related to the knowledge that each individual possesses alone. Thus personal beliefs that are formulated by this individual knowledge govern probabilities, leading to the notions of subjective probability and Bayesian probability. Consequently, subjective probabilities can be inferred by observing actions that reflect individuals' personal beliefs. Ramsey argued that the degree of probability that an individual attaches to a particular outcome can be measured by finding what odds the individual would accept when betting on that outcome.

Ramsey suggested a way of deriving a consistent theory of choice under uncertainty that could isolate beliefs from preferences while still maintaining subjective probabilities, although Ramsey later noted that "taking the whole field of chance events no generalizations about them are possible (consider e.g. infectious diseases, dactyls in hexameters, deaths from horse kicks, births of great men)."

Despite the fact that Ramsey's work on probabilities was of great importance, no one paid any attention to it until the publication of Theory of Games and Economic Behavior by John von Neumann and Oskar Morgenstern in 1944 (1947 2nd ed.), although after Ramsey's death, an approach to probability similar to his was developed independently by the Italian mathematician Bruno de Finetti.

==== A Contribution to the Theory of Taxation ====
This paper, first published in 1927 has been described by Joseph E. Stiglitz as "a landmark in the economics of public finance" Ramsey poses the question that is to be solved at the beginning of the article: "A given revenue is to be raised by proportionate taxes on some or all uses of income, the taxes on different uses being possibly at different rates; how much should these rates be adjusted in order that the decrement of utility may be a minimum?" The problem was suggested to him by the economist Arthur Pigou and the paper was Ramsey's answer to the problem.

In the same, Ramsey contributed to economic theory the elegant concept of Ramsey pricing. This is applicable in situations where a (regulated) monopolist wants to maximise consumer surplus whilst at the same time ensuring that its costs are adequately covered. This is achieved by setting the price such that the markup over marginal cost is inversely proportional to the price elasticity of demand for that good.

==== A Mathematical Theory of Saving ====
Described by Partha Dasgupta, in a Stanford Encyclopedia of Philosophy entry devoted to it, as "one of the dozen or so most influential papers of the 20th century" in the field of academic economics, "A Mathematical Theory of Saving" was originally published in The Economic Journal in 1928. It employed, as Paul Samuelson described it, "a strategically beautiful application of the calculus of variations" to determine the optimal amount an economy should invest rather than consume so as to maximise future utility, or as Ramsey put it, "How much of its income should a nation save?"

Keynes described the article as "one of the most remarkable contributions to mathematical economics ever made, both in respect of the intrinsic importance and difficulty of its subject, the power and elegance of the technical methods employed, and the clear purity of illumination with which the writer's mind is felt by the reader to play about its subject. The article is terribly difficult reading for an economist, but it is not difficult to appreciate how scientific and aesthetic qualities are combined in it together." The Ramsey model is today acknowledged as the starting point for optimal accumulation theory although its importance was not recognised until many years after its first publication.

The main contributions of the model were firstly the initial question Ramsey posed on how much savings should be and secondly the method of analysis, the intertemporal maximisation (optimisation) of collective or individual utility by applying techniques of dynamic optimisation. Tjalling C. Koopmans and David Cass modified the Ramsey model incorporating the dynamic features of population growth at a steady rate and of Harrod-neutral technical progress again at a steady rate, giving birth to a model named the Ramsey–Cass–Koopmans model where the objective now is to maximise household's utility function.

== Legacy ==
=== Frank P. Ramsey Medal ===
The Decision Analysis Society annually awards the Frank P. Ramsey Medal to recognise substantial contributions to decision theory and its application to important classes of real decision problems.

=== Frank Ramsey Professorships ===
Howard Raiffa was made the first Frank P. Ramsey Professor (of Managerial Economics) at Harvard University. Richard Zeckhauser was made the Frank P. Ramsey Professor of Political Economy at Harvard University in 1971. Raiffa's chair was joint between the Harvard Business and Kennedy Schools. Zeckhauser's chair is in the Kennedy School. Partha Dasgupta was made the Frank Ramsey Professor of Economics in 1994 and Frank Ramsey Professor Emeritus of Economics in 2010 at the University of Cambridge.

=== Ramsey effect ===
In 1999, the philosopher Donald Davidson gave the name "Ramsey effect" to anyone's realisation that their splendid new philosophical discovery already existed within Frank Ramsey's body of work.

== See also ==
- Clique game
- Expected utility hypothesis
- Money pump
- Ramsey cardinal
- Structural Ramsey theory
- Quantum Bayesianism
- Theorem on friends and strangers
- Type theory
- History of type theory
- Frederick Rowbottom
- Bayesian epistemology
