= Cambridge capital controversy =

Economic dispute

The Cambridge capital controversy, sometimes called "the capital controversy" or "the two Cambridges debate", was a dispute between proponents of two differing theoretical and mathematical positions in economics that started in the 1950s and lasted well into the 1960s. The debate concerned the nature and role of capital goods and a critique of the neoclassical vision of aggregate production and distribution. The name arises from the location of the principals involved in the controversy: the debate was largely between economists such as Joan Robinson and Piero Sraffa at the University of Cambridge in England and economists such as Paul Samuelson and Robert Solow at the Massachusetts Institute of Technology, in Cambridge, Massachusetts, United States.

The English side is most often labeled "post-Keynesian", while some call it "neo-Ricardian", and the Massachusetts side "neoclassical".

Most of the debate is mathematical, while some major elements can be explained as part of the aggregation problem. The critique of neoclassical capital theory might be summed up as saying that the theory suffers from the fallacy of composition; specifically, that we cannot extend microeconomic concepts to production by society as a whole. The resolution of the debate, particularly how broad its implications are, has not been agreed upon by economists.

== Background ==
In classical, orthodox economic theory, economic growth is assumed to be exogenously given: Growth is dependent on exogenous variables, such as population growth, technological improvement, and growth in natural resources. Classical theory claims that an increase in either of the factors of production, i.e. labor or capital, while holding the other constant and assuming no technological change, will increase output but at a diminishing rate that will eventually approach zero.

The so-called natural rate of economic growth is defined as the sum of the growth of the labor force and the growth of labor productivity. (Note: Or what Harrod originally termed "the rate of growth of the labor force in efficiency units". See Harrod (1939)) The concept of the natural rate of growth first appeared in Roy Harrod's 1939 article where it is defined as the "maximum rate of growth allowed by the increase of population, accumulation of capital, technological improvement and the work/ leisure preference schedule, supposing that there is always full employment in some sense." (Note: According to Harrod, the natural rate is the maximum rate of growth allowed by the increase of variables like population growth, technological improvement, and growth in natural resources. It is the highest attainable growth rate that would bring about the fullest possible employment of the resources existing in the economy. See Harrod (1939)) If the actual economic growth-rate falls below the natural rate, then the unemployment rate will rise; if it rises above it, the unemployment rate will fall. Consequently, the natural rate of growth must be the rate of growth that keeps the rate of unemployment constant.

If the natural rate of growth is not exogenously given, but is endogenous to demand, or to the actual rate of growth, this has two implications. At the theoretical level, there are implications for the efficiency and speed of the adjustment process between the warranted and the natural rates of growth in Harrod's growth model. Also, there are implications for the way the growth process should be viewed, and for understanding why growth rates differ between countries: whether growth is viewed as supply determined; or whether growth is viewed as demand determined; or determined by constraints on demand before supply constraints begin to operate.

Harrod produced a mathematical model of growth whereby the natural rate of growth fulfills two important functions. First, it sets the ceiling to the divergence between the actual growth rate and warranted growth rate (Note: In Harrod's paper, the warranted growth rate is the one that induces just enough investment to match planned full employment saving. There is no under-capacity or over-capacity utilization. This means that there is no reason for entrepreneurs to revise their investment plans upwards or downwards. See Dray (2010)) and turns cyclical growth into slumps. Consequently, it is important for generating cyclical behavior in trade-cycle models that rely on first-order difference equations. Second, it ostensibly provides the maximum attainable long-run rate of growth. (Note: What Harrod called the "social optimal rate of growth", without discussion of its determinants) The natural rate is treated as strictly exogenous; it is shaped by the growth of the labor force and the growth of labor productivity, without recognition nor assumption that both might be endogenous to demand. (Note: Besomi argues that this is why Harrod's growth theory is "not really a theory of growth at all," but a theory of the trade cycle dynamics around an "unexplained trend." See Besomi (1998)) Additionally, there was no fiscal or other economic mechanism in the theory that could bring the warranted rate of growth in line with the natural rate of growth, i.e. for society to achieve full or fuller utilization of its resources.

== Central issue ==
The question of whether the natural growth rate is exogenous, or endogenous to demand (and whether it is input growth that causes output growth, or vice versa), lies at the heart of the debate between neoclassical economists and Keynesian/post-Keynesian economists. The latter group argues that growth is primarily demand-driven because growth in the labor force as well as in labor productivity both respond to the pressure of demand, both domestic and foreign. Their view does not mean, post-Keynesians state, that demand growth determines supply growth without limit; rather, they claim that there is not one, single, full-employment growth path, and that, in many countries, demand constraints (related to excessive inflation and balance of payments difficulties) tend to arise long before supply constraints are ever reached.

== Modelling ==
=== The Harrod–Domar model ===
Roy Harrod, in his seminal 1933 paper, developed a model, subsequently refined by Russian-born Evsey Domar, that aims to explain an economy's growth rate in terms of the level of saving and of the productivity of capital. (Note: A similar model had been proposed by Gustav Cassel. See Cassel (1924)) Despite its progenitors' ostensibly Keynesian viewpoint, the Harrod–Domar model was actually the precursor to the exogenous growth model.

According to the Harrod–Domar model there are three kinds of growth: the rate of warranted growth; the rate of actual growth; and the natural rate of growth. The warranted growth-rate is the rate of growth at which the economy does not expand indefinitely or go into recession. The actual growth rate is the real rate-increase in a country's yearly GDP. The natural rate of growth is the rate that the growth of an economy requires so that full employment is maintained. For example, if the labor force grows at 3 percent per year, with everything else being equal, then to maintain full employment, the economy's annual growth rate must be 3 percent.

Neoclassical economists claimed shortcomings in the Harrod–Domar model, in particular pointing out instability in its solution, and, by the late 1950s, they started an academic dialogue that led to the development of the Solow–Swan model.

=== The Solow–Swan model ===
The model was developed separately and independently by Robert Solow and Trevor Swan in 1956, in response to the supposedly Keynesian Harrod–Domar model. Solow and Swan proposed an economic model of long-run economic growth set within the framework of neoclassical economics. They attempt to explain long-run economic growth by looking at capital accumulation; labor growth or population growth; and increases in productivity, commonly referred to as technological progress. At its core, the model offers a neoclassical (aggregate) production function, often specified to be of Cobb–Douglas type, which enables the model "to make contact with microeconomics". (Note: The idea of using a Cobb–Douglas production function at the core of a growth model dates back to Tinbergen (1942, pp. 511–549). See Brems (1986 pp. 362–268))

=== The post-Keynesian theory of growth ===
Post-Keynesian economists, such as Nicholas Kaldor, Luigi Pasinetti, Richard Kahn, and Joan Robinson, proposed a different model of growth. In their approach, the warranted rate of growth is brought into equality with the natural rate of growth by adjustments to income distribution. Although Kaldor and Pasinetti, for example, differed in how to justify this, the rate of profits is the quotient of the rate of growth and the ratio of the savings rate out of profits. This equation is known as the Cambridge equation. Investment, as in Keynes, is taken as an independent variable, and savings adjust to investment.

== The debate ==
The Harrod–Domar model's lack of a mechanism that could bring the warranted rate of growth into line with the natural rate of growth triggered the growth debate in the mid-1950s, a debate that "engaged some of the greatest minds in the economics profession for over two decades." The neoclassical and Neo-Keynesian sides were represented by Paul Samuelson, Robert Solow, and Franco Modigliani, who taught at the MIT, in Cambridge, Massachusetts, US, while the Keynesian and Post-Keynesian sides were represented by Nicholas Kaldor, Joan Robinson, Luigi Pasinetti, Piero Sraffa, and Richard Kahn, who mostly taught at the University of Cambridge in England. The common name of the two places gave rise to the terms "the two Cambridges debate" or "the Cambridge capital controversy."

Both camps generally treated the natural rate of growth as given. Virtually all the focus of the debate centered on the potential mechanisms by which the warranted growth rate might be made to converge on the natural rate, giving a long-run, equilibrium growth-path. The American Cambridge side focused on adjustments to the capital/output ratio through capital-labour substitution if capital and labour were growing at different rates. The English Cambridge side concentrated on adjustments to the saving ratio through changes in the distribution of income between wages and profits, on the assumption that the propensity to save out of profits is higher than out of wages.

== Ideological issues ==
Much of the emotion behind the debate arose because the technical criticisms of marginal productivity theory were connected to wider arguments with ideological implications. The neoclassical economist John Bates Clark saw the equilibrium rate of profit (which helps to determine the income of the owners of capital goods) as a market price determined by technology and the relative proportions in which the "factors of production" are used in production. Just as wages are the reward for the labor that workers do, profits are the reward for the productive contributions of capital: thus, the normal operations of the system under competitive conditions pay profits to the owners of capital. Responding to the "indictment that hangs over society" that it involves "exploiting labor," Clark wrote:

It is the purpose of this work [his 1899 'Distribution of Wealth'] to show that the distribution of the income of society is controlled by a natural law, and that this law, if it worked without friction, would give to every agent of production the amount of wealth which that agent creates. However wages may be adjusted by bargains freely made between individual men [i.e., without labor unions and other "market imperfections"], the rates of pay that result from such transactions tend, it is here claimed, to equal that part of the product of industry which is traceable to the labor itself; and however interest [i.e., profit] may be adjusted by similarly free bargaining, it naturally tends to equal the fractional product that is separately traceable to capital.

These profits are in turn seen as rewards for saving, i.e., abstinence from current consumption, which leads to the creation of the capital goods. (Later, John Maynard Keynes and his school argued that saving does not automatically lead to investment in tangible capital goods.) Thus, in this view, profit income is a reward for those who value future income highly and are thus willing to sacrifice current enjoyment. Strictly speaking, however, modern neoclassical theory does not say that capital's or labor's income is "deserved" in some moral or normative sense.

Some members of the Marxian school argue that even if the means of production "earned" a return based on their marginal product, that does not imply that their owners (i.e., the capitalists) created the marginal product and should be rewarded. In the Sraffian view, the rate of profit is not a price, and it is not clear that it is determined in a market. In particular, it only partially reflects the scarcity of the means of production relative to their demand. While the prices of different types of means of production are prices, the rate of profit can be seen in Marxian terms, as reflecting the social and economic power that owning the means of production gives this minority to exploit the majority of workers and to receive profit. But not all followers of Sraffa interpret his theory of production and capital in this Marxian way. Nor do all Marxists embrace the Sraffian model: in fact, such authors as Michael Lebowitz and Frank Roosevelt are highly critical of Sraffian interpretations, except as a narrow technical critique of the neoclassical view. There are also Marxian economists, like Michael Albert and Robin Hahnel, who consider the Sraffian theory of prices, wages and profit to be superior to Marx's own theory.

== The aggregation problem ==
In neoclassical economics, a production function is often assumed, for example,

$$Q = A f(K,L)$$

where Q is output, A is factor representing technology, K is the sum of the value of capital goods, and L is the labor input. The price of the homogeneous output is taken as the numéraire, so that the value of each capital good is taken as homogeneous with output. Different types of labor are assumed reduced to a common unit, usually unskilled labor. Both inputs have a positive impact on output, with diminishing marginal returns.

In some more complicated general equilibrium models developed by the neoclassical school, labor and capital are assumed to be heterogeneous and measured in physical units. In most versions of neoclassical growth theory (for example, in the Solow growth model), however, the function is assumed to apply to the entire economy. This view portrays an economy as one big factory rather than as a collection of a large number of heterogeneous workplaces.

This vision produces a core proposition in textbook neoclassical economics, i.e., that the income earned by each "factor of production" (essentially, labor and "capital") is equal to its marginal product. Thus, with perfect product and input markets, the wage (divided by the price of the product) is alleged to equal the marginal physical product of labor. More importantly for the discussion here, the rate of profit (sometimes confused with the rate of interest, i.e., the cost of borrowing funds) is supposed to equal the marginal physical product of capital. (For simplicity, abbreviate "capital goods" as "capital.") A second core proposition is that a change in the price of a factor of production will lead to a change in the use of that factor – an increase in the rate of profit (associated with falling wages) will lead to more of that factor being used in production. The law of diminishing marginal returns implies that greater use of this input will imply a lower marginal product, all else equal: since a firm is getting less from adding a unit of capital goods than is received from the previous one, the rate of profit must increase to encourage the employment of that extra unit, assuming profit maximization.

Piero Sraffa and Joan Robinson, whose work set off the Cambridge controversy, pointed out that there was an inherent measurement problem in applying this model of income distribution to capital. Robinson developed her contribution to this critique in her 1953 paper “The Production Function and the Theory of Capital,” where she addressed the question of what units of capital could be measured in. She argued that valuing a stock of capital goods cannot be done without first knowing the rate of profit, since capital goods are valued by the income they are expected to generate. However, the production function is supposed to determine the rate of profit. As she put it, a student of economics is taught to write output as a function of labor and capital but is then “hurried on to the next question, in the hope that he will forget to ask in what units C is measured.” Robinson identified that this was a methodological error, since valuing capital requires the rate of interest to be taken as given, rather than determined by the theory itself. She insisted that this problem could not be resolved by only adding up monetary values of capital goods, since those values shift as the rate of profit changes. She concluded that this rendered “the major part of neo-classical doctrine spurious.”

Capitalist income (total profit or property income) is defined as the rate of profit multiplied by the amount of capital, but the measurement of the "amount of capital" involves adding up quite incomparable physical objects – adding the number of trucks to the number of lasers, for example. That is, just as one cannot add heterogeneous "apples and oranges," we cannot simply add up simple units of "capital." As Robinson argued, there is no such thing as "leets," an inherent element of each capital good that can be added up independent of the prices of those goods.

=== Sraffian presentation ===
Neoclassical economists assumed that there was no real problem here. They said: just add up the money value of all these different capital items to get an aggregate amount of capital (while correcting for inflation's effects). But Sraffa pointed out that this financial measure of the amount of capital is determined partly by the rate of profit. This is a problem because neoclassical theory tells us that this rate of profit is itself supposed to be determined by the amount of capital being used. There is circularity in the argument. A falling profit rate has a direct effect on the amount of capital; it does not simply cause greater employment of it.

In very simple terms, suppose that capital currently consists of 10 trucks and 5 lasers. Trucks are produced and sold for $50,000 each, while each laser goes for $30,000. Thus, the value of our capital equals the sum of (price)*(quantity) = 10*$50,000 + 5*$30,000 = $650,000 = K.

As noted, this K can change if the rate of profit rises. To see this, define the price of production for the two types of capital goods. For each item, follow the type of pricing rule used by Classical economics for produced items, where price is determined by explicit costs of production:

P = (labor cost per unit) + (capital cost per unit)*(1 + r)

Here, P is the price of an item and r is the rate of profit. Assume that the owners of the factories are rewarded by receiving income proportional to the capital that they advanced for production (with the proportion being determined by the profit rate). Assume that the labor cost per unit equals W in each sector (and does not change). Both r and W are assumed to be equalized between sectors due to competition, i.e., the mobility of capital and labor between sectors.

Note that this classical conception of pricing is different from the standard neoclassical "supply and demand" vision. It refers to long-run price determination. It can be reconciled with neoclassical economics by assuming that production follows constant returns to scale.

Further, this formulation does not treat the rate of profit as a price determined by supply and demand. Rather, it fits more with neoclassical conceptions of "normal" profits. These refer to the basic profits that the owners of capital must receive in order to stay in business in their sector. Third, while neoclassical economics assumes that the "normal" rate of profit is determined by aggregate production (as discussed above), this formulation takes the rate of profit as exogenously given. That is because the whole neoclassical theory of profit-rate determination is being questioned: if we can go from the marginal product of capital to the profit rate, we should be able to go from the profit rate to the marginal product. In any event, few if any participants in the Cambridge Controversy attacked the Sraffian critique on these grounds.

Go back to the pricing formula above. As in the real world, the capital intensity of production (capital cost per unit) differs between the sectors producing the different types of capital goods. Suppose that it takes twice as much capital per unit of output to produce trucks than it does to produce lasers, so that the capital cost per unit equals $20,000 for trucks (T) and $10,000 for lasers (L), where these coefficients are initially assumed not to change. Then,

P_{T} = W + $20,000*(1 + r)

P_{L} = W + $10,000*(1 + r)

If W = $10,000 and r = 1 = 100% (an extreme case used to make the calculations obvious), then P_{T} = $50,000 and P_{L} = $30,000, as assumed. As above, K = $650,000.

Now, suppose that r falls to zero (another extreme case). Then P_{T} = $30,000 and P_{L} = $20,000, so that the value of the capital equals 10*$30,000 + 5*$20,000 = $400,000. The value of K thus varies with the rate of profit. Note that it does not vary in proportion as with a general inflation or deflation that changes both prices by the same percentage: the exact result depends on the relative "capital intensity" of the two sectors.

This result is not changed by the fact that for both items, the capital cost per unit would change as the two prices change (contrary to the assumption made above). Nor does it change if the wage rate and labor cost per unit (W) change.

Also, an obvious riposte is that we can aggregate capital simply by using the first set of prices and ignoring the second, as with many inflation corrections. This does not work, however, because the variation of the rate of profit is theorized as happening at a specific point in time in purely mathematical terms rather than as part of an historical process. The point is that if neoclassical conceptions do not work at a specific time (statics), they cannot handle the more complicated issues of dynamics. This critique of the neoclassical conception is more of a matter of pointing out its major technical flaws in the theory than of presenting an alternative.

In general, this discussion says that the distribution of income (and r) helps determine the measured amount of capital rather than being solely determined by that amount. It also says that physical capital is heterogeneous and cannot be added up the way that financial capital can. For the latter, all units are measured in money terms and can thus be easily summed. Even then, of course, the price of a sum of financial capital varies with interest rates.

Sraffa suggested an aggregation technique (stemming in part from Marxian economics) by which a measure of the amount of capital could be produced: by reducing all machines to a sum of dated labor from different years. A machine produced in the year 2000 can then be treated as the labor and commodity inputs used to produce it in 1999 (multiplied by the rate of profit); and the commodity inputs in 1999 can be further reduced to the labor inputs that made them in 1998 plus the commodity inputs (multiplied by the rate of profit again); and so on until the non-labor component was reduced to a negligible (but non-zero) amount. Then you could add up the dated labor value of a truck to the dated labor value of a laser.

However, Sraffa then pointed out that this accurate measuring technique still involved the rate of profit: the amount of capital depended on the rate of profit. This reversed the direction of causality that neoclassical economics assumed between the rate of profit and the amount of capital. Further, Sraffa showed that a change in the rate of profit would change the measured amount of capital, and in highly nonlinear ways: an increase in the rate of profit might initially increase the perceived value of the truck more than the laser, but then reverse the effect at still higher rates of profit. See "Reswitching" below. The analysis further implies that a more intensive use of a factor of production, including other factors than capital, may be associated with a higher, not lower price, of that factor.

According to the Cambridge, England, critics, this analysis is thus a serious challenge, particularly in factor markets, to the neoclassical vision of prices as indices of scarcity and the simple neoclassical version of the principle of substitution.

=== General equilibrium presentation ===
A different way to understand the aggregation problem does not involve the Classical pricing equations. Think about a decrease in the r, the return on capital (corresponding to a rise in w, the wage rate, given that initial levels of capital and technology stay constant). This causes a change in the distribution of income, the nature of the various capital goods demanded, and thus a change in their prices. This causes a change in the value of K (as discussed above). So, again, the rate of return on K (i.e., r) is not independent of the measure of K, as assumed in the neoclassical model of growth and distribution. Causation goes both ways, from K to r and from r to K. This problem is sometimes seen as analogous to the Sonnenschein–Mantel–Debreu results (e.g., by Mas-Colell 1989) in general equilibrium theory, which shows that representative agent models cannot be theoretically justified, except under restrictive conditions (see Kirman, 1992 for an explanation of the Sonnenschein–Mantel–Debreu results as an aggregation problem). Note that this says that it's not simply K that is subject to aggregation problems: so is L.

=== Simple mathematical presentation ===
A third way to look this problem is to remember that many neoclassical economists assume that both individual firms (or sectors) and the entire economy fit the Cobb–Douglas production function with constant returns to scale. That is, output of each sector i is determined by the equation:

$Y_{i} = A_{i}.K_{i}^{a}.L_{i}^{1-a}$

Here, A is a constant (representing technology and the like), K is supposed to represent the stock of capital goods (assumed to be measurable), and L is the amount of labor input. The coefficient a is supposed to represent the technology for this sector i. (Its subscript is left out for convenience.)

The problem is that unless we impose very strong mathematical restrictions, we cannot say that this Cobb–Douglas production function for sector i plus one for sector j (plus that for sector k, etc.) adds up to a Cobb–Douglas production function for the economy as a whole (with K and L being the sum of all of the different sectoral values). In short, for the sum of Cobb–Douglas production functions to equal a Cobb–Douglas, the production functions for all of the different sectors have to have the same values of A and a.

== Reswitching ==
Reswitching means that there is no simple (monotonic) relationship between the nature of the techniques of production used and the rate of profit. For example, we may see a situation in which a technique of production is cost-minimizing at low and high rates of profits, but another technique is cost-minimizing at intermediate rates.

Reswitching implies the possibility of capital reversing, an association between high interest rates (or rates of profit) and more capital-intensive techniques. Thus, reswitching implies the rejection of a simple (monotonic) non-increasing relationship between capital intensity and the rate of profit, sometimes referred to as the rate of interest. As rates fall, for example, profit-seeking businesses can switch from using one set of techniques (A) to another (B) and then back to A. This problem arises for either a macroeconomic or a microeconomic production process and so goes beyond the aggregation problems discussed above.

In a 1966 article, the neoclassical economist Paul A. Samuelson summarizes the reswitching debate:

"The phenomenon of switching back at a very low interest rate to a set of techniques that had seemed viable only at a very high interest rate involves more than esoteric difficulties. It shows that the simple tale told by Jevons, Böhm-Bawerk, Wicksell and other neoclassical writers — alleging that, as the interest rate falls in consequence of abstention from present consumption in favor of future, technology must become in some sense more 'roundabout,' more 'mechanized' and 'more productive' — cannot be universally valid." ("A Summing Up," Quarterly Journal of Economics vol. 80, 1966, p. 568.)

Samuelson gives an example involving both the Sraffian concept of new products made with labor employing capital goods represented by dead or "dated labor" (rather than machines having an independent role) and Böhm-Bawerk's concept of "roundaboutness" — supposedly a physical measure of capital intensity.

Instead of simply taking a neoclassical production function for granted, Samuelson follows the Sraffian tradition of constructing a production function from positing alternative methods to produce a product. The posited methods exhibit different mixes of inputs. Samuelson shows how profit maximizing (cost minimizing) indicates the best way of producing the output, given an externally specified wage or profit rate. Samuelson ends up rejecting his previously held view that heterogeneous capital could be treated as a single capital good, homogeneous with the consumption good, through a "surrogate production function".

Consider Samuelson's Böhm-Bawerkian approach. In his example, there are two techniques, A and B, that use labor at different times (–1, –2, and –3, representing years in the past) to produce output of 1 unit at the later time 0 (the present).

Two production techniques
time period	input or output	technique A	technique B
–3	labor input	0	2
–2	labor input	7	0
–1	labor input	0	6
0	output	1	1

Then, using this example (and further discussion), Samuelson demonstrates that it is impossible to define the relative "roundaboutness" of the two techniques as in this example, contrary to Böhm-Bawerkian assertions. He shows that at a profit rate above 100 percent technique A will be used by a profit-maximizing business; between 50 and 100 percent, technique B will be used; while at an interest rate below 50 percent, technique A will be used again. The interest-rate numbers are extreme, but this phenomenon of reswitching can be shown to occur in other examples using more moderate interest rates.

The second table shows three possible interest rates and the resulting accumulated total labor costs for the two techniques. Since the benefits of each of the two processes is the same, we can simply compare costs. The costs in time 0 are calculated in the standard economic way, assuming that each unit of labor costs $w to hire:

$Cost = (1+i)w.L_{-1}+(1+i)^{2}w.L_{-2}+(1+i)^{3}w.L_{-3}+...+(1+i)^{n}w.L_{-n}$

where L_{–n} is the amount of labor input in time n previous to time 0.

Reswitching
interest rate	technique A	technique B
150%	**$43.75**	$46.25
75%	$21.44	**$21.22**
0%	**$7.00**	$8.00

The results in bold-face indicate which technique is less expensive, showing reswitching. There is no simple (monotonic) relationship between the interest rate and the "capital intensity" or roundaboutness of production, either at the macro- or the microeconomic level of aggregation.

== Standpoints ==
Naturally enough, the two contending schools arrive at different conclusions concerning this debate. It is useful to quote some of these.

=== Sraffian views ===
Here are some of the Cambridge critics' views:

"Capital reversing renders meaningless the neoclassical concepts of input substitution and capital scarcity or labor scarcity. It puts in jeopardy the neoclassical theory of capital and the notion of input demand curves, both at the economy and industry levels. It also puts in jeopardy the neoclassical theories of output and employment determination, as well as Wicksellian monetary theories, since they are all deprived of stability. The consequences for neoclassical analysis are thus quite devastating. It is usually asserted that only aggregate neoclassical theory of the textbook variety — and hence macroeconomic theory, based on aggregate production functions — is affected by capital reversing. It has been pointed out, however, that when neoclassical general equilibrium models are extended to long-run equilibria, stability proofs require the exclusion of capital reversing (Schefold 1997). In that sense, all neoclassical production models would be affected by capital reversing." (Lavoie 2000)

"These findings destroy, for example, the general validity of Heckscher–Ohlin–Samuelson international trade theory (as authors such as Sergio Parrinello, Stanley Metcalfe, Ian Steedman, and Lynn Mainwaring have demonstrated), of the Hicksian neutrality of technical progress concept (as Steedman has shown), of neoclassical tax incidence theory (as Steedman and Metcalfe have shown), and of the Pigouvian taxation theory applied in environmental economics (as Gehrke and Lager have shown)." (Gehrke and Lager 2000)

Recent work includes empirical applications using input-output data, applications to environmental economics, an analysis of the properties of random matrices, a demonstration that the CCC applies to non-competitive markets with markup pricing, and extensions of work with fixed capital.

=== Neoclassical views ===
The neoclassical economist Christopher Bliss comments:

"...what one might call the existential aspect of capital theory has not attracted much interest in the past 25 years. A small band of 'true believers' has kept up the assault on capital theory orthodoxy until today, and from their company comes at least one of my co-editers[sic]. I shall call that loosely connected school the Anglo-Italian theorists. No simple name is ideal, but the one I have chosen indicates at least that the influences of Piero Sraffa and Joan Robinson, in particular, are of central importance. Even in that case, there is a flavour of necrophilia in the air. If one asks the question: what new idea has come out of Anglo-Italian thinking in the past 20 years?, one creates an embarrassing social situation. This is because it is not clear that anything new has come out of the old, bitter debates.

Meanwhile mainstream theorizing has taken different directions. Interest has shifted from general equilibrium style (high-dimension) models to simple, mainly one-good models. Ramsey-style dynamic-optimization models have largely displaced the fixed-saving coefficient approach. The many consumers that Stiglitz implanted into neoclassical growth modelling did not flourish there. Instead the representative agent is usually now the model's driver. Finally, the exogenous technical progress of Harrod, and most writers on growth from whatever school in the 1960s and later, has been joined by numerous models which make technical progress endogenous in one of the several possible ways...

...Can the old concerns about capital be taken out, dusted down and addressed to contemporary models? If that could be done, one would hope that its contribution could be more constructive than the mutually assured destruction approach that marred some of the 1960s debates. It is evident that richer models yield richer possibilities. They do not do that in proportion when optimization drives model solutions. However, we know that many-agent models can have multiple equilibria when all agents optimize. There may be fruitful paths forward in that direction.

Old contributions should best be left buried when they involve using capital as a stick to beat marginal theory. All optima imply marginal conditions in some form. These conditions are part of an overall solution. Neither they nor the quantities involved in them are prior to the overall solution. It reflects badly on economists and their keenness of intellect that this was not always obvious to everyone." (Bliss 2005)

In his 1975 book Capital Theory and the Distribution of Income, Bliss showed that in general equilibrium, there is no relationship between relative scarcity of an input and relative price. However, the return to each factor remains equal to its dis-aggregated marginal productivity.

=== Austrian views ===
Austrian economists for the most part dismiss the debate as irrelevant. As various Austrian economists such as Ludwig von Mises, Israel Kirzner, Ludwig Lachmann, and Jesús Huerta de Soto explain, Austrian capital theory is immune to reswitching as a critique, since Austrian economics' subjectivism forbids positing hard physical relationships between roundaboutness and the interest rate. Thus, they reject Böhm-Bawerk's theory of capital (although they adhere to his focus on time-preference as explanatory of interest rates). Instead, they recast roundaboutness in prospective terms, and simply view reswitching as a rare, but possible phenomenon. Austrian school economists hold to their own version of Robinson's aggregation problem, agreeing heterogeneous capital can't be rigorously aggregated. Robert Murphy shows in a general equilibrium model that in a world with heterogeneous capital, interest rates indicate time-preference, but not the marginal productivity of capital. Huerta De Soto argues that reswitching actually benefits Austrian capital theory, but warns:

We must not forget that although neo-Ricardians may have been circumstantial allies to the Austrians in their criticism of the neoclassical trend, the neo-Ricardians’ stated objective is precisely to neutralize the influence (which is not yet strong enough, in our opinion) exerted on economics since 1871 by the subjectivist revolution Menger started. (Huerta De Soto 2006)

Saverio Fratini argues that certain "Neo-Austrian" forms of capital theory based on Böhm-Bawerk's work present in some iterations of the Austrian Business Cycle Theory damages those versions of the theory. Peter Lewin and Nicolas Cachanosky argue against Fratini, and more developed versions of the cycle not based on "Neo-Austrian" capital theory are unaffected by reswitching.

=== Marxian Views ===
Marxians have displayed a fair bit of concern over the grim implications reswitching has for the logical consistency of Marxian work. The Capital Controversies, like the transformation problem, are another refutation of the labor theory of value, since they showed that the equilibrium rate of profit is not strictly dependent on the capital to labor ratio of a commodity. Marxist economist Eduardo M. Ochoa admits that in theory, the labor theory of value is rendered logically untenable by reswitching, but argues that in practice, reswitching is not empirically likely if you observe wage curves in the US economy.

== Conclusion ==
Part of the problem in this debate revolved around the high level of abstraction and idealization that occurs in economic model-building on topics such as capital and economic growth. The original neoclassical models of aggregate growth presented by Robert Solow and Trevor Swan were straightforward, with simple results and uncomplicated conclusions which implied predictions about the real, empirical, world. The followers of Robinson and Sraffa argued that more sophisticated and complicated mathematical models implied that for the Solow–Swan model to say anything about the world, crucial unrealistic assumptions (that Solow and Swan had ignored) must be true.

To choose an example that did not get much attention in the debate (because it was shared by both sides), the Solow–Swan model assumes a continuously-attained equilibrium with 'full employment' of all resources. Contrary to Keynesian economics, saving determines investment in these models (rather than vice versa). The fact that the critique was also stated entirely using exactly the same kind of unrealistic assumptions meant that it was very difficult to do anything but 'criticize' Solow and Swan.

In short, the progress produced by the Cambridge Controversy was from the unrealistic reliance on unstated or unknown assumptions to a clear consciousness about the need to make such assumptions. But this left the Sraffians in a situation where the unreal assumptions prevented most empirical applications, along with further developments of the theory. Thus it is not surprising that Bliss asks: "what new idea has come out of Anglo-Italian thinking in the past 20 years?"

Even though Sraffa, Robinson, and others had argued that its foundations were unfounded, the Solow–Swan growth model based on a single-valued aggregate stock of capital goods has remained a centerpiece of neoclassical macroeconomics and growth theory. It is also the basis for the "new growth theory." In some cases, the use of an aggregate production function is justified with an appeal to a instrumentalist methodology and a need for simplicity in empirical work.

Neoclassical theorists, such as Bliss, (quoted above) have generally accepted the "Anglo-Italian" critique of the simple neoclassical model and have moved on, applying the 'more general' political-economic vision of neoclassical economics to new questions. Some theorists, such as Bliss, Edwin Burmeister, and Frank Hahn, argued that rigorous neoclassical theory is most appropriately set forth in terms of microeconomics and intertemporal general equilibrium models.

The critics, such as Pierangelo Garegnani (2008), Fabio Petri (2009), and Bertram Schefold (2005), have repeatedly argued that such models are not empirically applicable and that, in any case, the capital-theoretical problems reappear in such models in a different form. The abstract nature of such models has made it more difficult to clearly reveal such problems in as clear a form as they appear in long-period models.

Since Samuelson had been one of the main neoclassical defenders of the idea that heterogeneous capital could be treated as a single capital good, his article (discussed above) conclusively showed that results from simplified models with one capital good do not necessarily hold in more general models. He thus mostly uses multi-sectoral models of the Leontief–Sraffian tradition instead of the neoclassical aggregate model.

Most often, neoclassicals simply ignore the controversy, while many do not even know about it. Indeed, the vast majority of economics graduate schools in the United States do not teach their students about it:

It is important, for the record, to recognize that key participants in the debate openly admitted their mistakes. Samuelson's seventh edition of Economics was purged of errors. Levhari and Samuelson published a paper which began, 'We wish to make it clear for the record that the nonreswitching theorem associated with us is definitely false. We are grateful to Dr. Pasinetti...' (Levhari and Samuelson 1966). Leland Yeager and I jointly published a note acknowledging his earlier error and attempting to resolve the conflict between our theoretical perspectives. (Burmeister and Yeager, 1978).

However, the damage had been done, and Cambridge, UK, 'declared victory': Levhari was wrong, Samuelson was wrong, Solow was wrong, MIT was wrong and therefore neoclassical economics was wrong. As a result there are some groups of economists who have abandoned neoclassical economics for their own refinements of classical economics. In the United States, on the other hand, mainstream economics goes on as if the controversy had never occurred. Macroeconomics textbooks discuss 'capital' as if it were a well-defined concept — which it is not, except in a very special one-capital-good world (or under other unrealistically restrictive conditions). The problems of heterogeneous capital goods have also been ignored in the 'rational expectations revolution' and in virtually all econometric work.

— Burmeister 2000, p. 312

== See also ==
- Capital as Power

== Bibliography ==
- Acemoglu, Daron (2009). "The Solow Growth Model". Introduction to Modern Economic Growth. Princeton: Princeton University Press. pp. 26–76. ISBN 978-0-691-13292-1.
- Albert, Michael & Robin Hahnel (2017) [1990]. Quiet Revolution in Welfare Economics, Princeton University Press, ISBN 978-0691629483
- Besomi, Daniele (1998). "Failing to Win Consent : Harrod's Dynamics in the Eyes of His Readers", Economic Dynamics, Trade and Growth : Essays on Harrodian Themes (G. Rampa, L. Stella, and A. P. Thirlwall editors), London: Palgrave-Macmillan, ISBN 978-1-349-26931-0
- Bjork, Gordon J. (1999). The Way It Worked and Why It Won't: Structural Change and the Slowdown of U.S. Economic Growth. Westport, CT; London: Praeger. ISBN 978-0-275-96532-7.
- Bliss, Christopher (2005). "Introduction, The Theory of Capital: A Personal Overview", in C. Bliss, A. Cohen and G.C. Harcourt (eds.) Capital Theory, (Cheltenham, UK: Edward Elgar), Vol. I, pp. xxvii–lx.
- Brems, Hans (1975). "The capital controversy: A Cambridge, Massachusetts View of Cambridge, England", De Economist, Volume 123, Issue 3
- Brems, Hans (1986). "Neoclassical Growth: Tinbergen and Solow". Pioneering Economic Theory, 1630–1980. Baltimore: Johns Hopkins University Press. pp. 362–368. ISBN 978-0-8018-2667-2.
- Burmeister, Edwin (2000). "The capital theory controversy". In Kurz, Heinz D. (ed.). Critical essays on Piero Sraffa's legacy in economics. Cambridge University Press. pp. 305–314. ISBN 978-0-521-58089-2.
- Cassel, Gustav (1967) [1924]. "Capital and Income in the Money Economy" (PDF). The Theory of Social Economy. New York: Augustus M. Kelley. pp. 51–63.
- Cohen, Avi J.; Harcourt, Geoffrey C. (1 February 2003). "Whatever happened to the Cambridge Capital Theory controversies?". Journal of Economic Perspectives. 17 (1): 199–214. doi:10.1257/089533003321165010. ISSN 0895-3309.
- Domar, Evsey (1946). "Capital Expansion, Rate of Growth, and Employment" (PDF). Econometrica. 14 (2): 137–147. doi:10.2307/1905364. JSTOR 1905364.
- Dray, Mark & Thirlwall, A. P. (2010) : "The endogeneity of the natural rate of growth for a selection of Asian countries", Journal of Post Keynesian Economics, Spring 2011, Vol. 33, No. 3
- Fratini, Saverio (2019). "A note on re-switching, the average period of production and the Austrian business-cycle theory". Review of Austrian Economics. 32 (4): 363–374. doi:10.1007/s11138-019-0432-0.
- Garegnani, Pierangelo (2008)."Capital in the Neoclassical Theory. Some Notes", in Joan Robinson and Modern Economic Theory (George R. Feiwel, editor), Palgrave Macmillan, ISBN 978-1-349-08633-7
- Gehrke, Christian and Christian Lager (2000). "Sraffian Political Economy", Encyclopedia of Political Economy, Routledge
- Hagemann, Harald (2009). "Solow's 1956 Contribution in the Context of the Harrod–Domar Model". History of Political Economy. 41 (Suppl 1): 67–87. doi:10.1215/00182702-2009-017.
- Hahnel, Robin (2017). Radical Political Economy: Sraffa Versus Marx. London: Routledge
- Han, Zonghie & Bertram Schefold (2006). "An empirical investigation of paradoxes: Reswitching and reverse capital deepening in capital theory". Cambridge Journal of Economics. 30 (5): 737–765. doi:10.1093/cje/bei089.
- Harcourt, G. C. (1972). Some Cambridge Controversies in the Theory of Capital. Cambridge: Cambridge University Press 1972
- Harcourt, G. C. and N.F. Laing (1971). Capital and Growth, Harmondsworth, UK: Penguin
- Harrod, Roy (March 1939). "An Essay in Dynamic Theory". Economic Journal. 49 (193): 14–33. doi:10.2307/2225181. JSTOR 2225181
- Hicks, John Richard (1939). Value and Capital: An Inquiry into some Fundamental Principles of Economic Theory. Oxford: Clarendon Press. ISBN 978-0198282693.
- Huang, Biao (2019). "Revisiting fixed capital models in the Sraffa framework". Economica Politica. 36 (2): 351–371. doi:10.1007/s40888-019-00147-7.
- Huerta De Soto, J. (2006). Money, Bank Credit, and Economic Cycles. Auburn, Alabama, Ludwig Von Mises Institute.
- Kirman, Alan P. (1992). "Whom or What does the Representative Individual Represent?" Journal of Economic Perspectives 6(2), 117–136
- Kirzner, I.M., 1996. Essays on Capital and Interest. Edward Elgar Publishing.
- Kurz, Heinz D. (1987). "capital theory: paradoxes, The New Palgrave: A Dictionary of Economics, London and New York: Macmillan and Stockton, pp. 359–363
- Kurz, Heinz D. and Neri Salvadori (1995) Theory of Production: A Long-Period Analysis, Cambridge University Press.
- Lachmann, L. M. (1976). On Austrian Capital Theory.
- Lavoie, Marc (2000). "Capital Reversing", Encyclopedia of Political Economy, Routledge
- Lebowitz, Michael (2009). "Another Crisis of Economic Theory: The Neo-Ricardian Critique", Following Marx: Method, Critique and Crisis, Leiden & Boston: Brill, 2009, ISBN 978-1608460335
- Lewin, P. and Cachanosky, N. (2019). Capital and Finance: Theory and History
- Mas-Colell, Andreu (1989). "Capital Theory Paradoxes: Anything Goes", in Joan Robinson and Modern Economic Theory (G. R. Feiwel, editor), New York University Press, ISBN 978-1-349-08633-7
- Mises, L. v. (1949). Human Action: A Treatise on Economics. Mansfield Centre: Martino Publishing.
- Murphy, R. P. (2005). DANGERS OF THE ONE-GOOD MODEL:BOHM-BAWERK’S CRITIQUE OF THE “NAIVE PRODUCTIVITY THEORY OF INTEREST”
- Ochoa, E. M. (1989) Values, prices, and wage-profit curves in the US economy.
- Opocher, Arrigo and Ian Steedman (2015) Full Industry Equilibrium: A Theory of the Industrial Long Run, Cambridge University Press.
- Pasinetti, Luigi (1977) Lectures on the Theory of Production, Columbia University Press.
- Pasinetti, Luigi and Roberto Scazzieri (1987). "Capital Theory: Paradoxes", The New Palgrave: A Dictionary of Economics, London and New York: Macmillan and Stockton, pp. 363–68.
- Petri, Fabio (2009) "On the Recent Debate on Capital Theory and General Equilibrium", Economic Department of the University of Siena
- Piketty, Thomas (2014). Capital in the Twenty-First Century, Belknap Press: imprint of Harvard University Press, ISBN 978-0674430006
- Samuelson, Paul (1987). "Sraffian economics," The New Palgrave: A Dictionary of Economics, v. 3, pp. 452–460.
- Sato, Ryuzo (1964). "The Harrod–Domar Model vs the Neo-Classical Growth Model". The Economic Journal. 74 (294): 380–387. doi:10.2307/2228485. JSTOR 2228485.
- Scarfe, Brian L. (1977). "The Harrod Model and the 'Knife Edge' Problem". Cycles, Growth, and Inflation: A Survey of Contemporary Macrodynamics. New York: McGraw-Hill. pp. 63–66. ISBN 978-0-07-055039-1.
- Schefold, Bertram (1989). Mr. Sraffa on Joint Production and Other Essays, Routledge.
- Schefold, Bertram (1997). Normal Prices, Technical Change and Accumulation. London: Macmillan
- Schefold, Bertram (2005). "Reswitching as a Cause of Instability of Intertemporal Equilibrium", Metroeconomica, Vol. 56, No. 4, pp. 438–476
- Schefold, Bertram (2023). "The rarity of reswitching explained". Structural Change and Economic Dynamics. 67: 128–150. doi:10.1016/j.strueco.2023.07.004.
- Schlefer, Jonathan (2017). The Assumptions Economists Make, Belknap Press: imprint of Harvard University Press; reprint edition, ISBN 978-0674975408
- Solow, Robert M. (1956). "A contribution to the theory of economic growth" (PDF). Quarterly Journal of Economics. 70 (1): 65–94. doi:10.2307/1884513. JSTOR 1884513.
- Solow, Robert M. (1994). "Perspectives on Growth Theory". Journal of Economic Perspectives. 8 (1): 45–54. doi:10.1257/jep.8.1.45. JSTOR 2138150.
- Stiglitz, Joseph (1974). "The Cambridge-Cambridge Controversy in the Theory of Capital; A View from New Haven: A Review Article", Journal of Political Economy, 82(4), pp. 893–903. JSTOR 1837157
- Swan, Trevor W. (November 1956). "Economic growth and capital accumulation". Economic Record. 32 (2): 334–361. doi:10.1111/j.1475-4932.1956.tb00434.x.
- Tcherneva, Pavlina (2011). "Bernanke's paradox: can he reconcile his position on the federal budget with his recent charge to prevent deflation?", Journal of Post Keynesian Economics, Vol. 33, No. 3
- Tinbergen, J. (1942). "Zur Theorie der langfristigen Wirtschaftsentwicklung". Weltwirtschaftliches Archiv. 55: 511–549. JSTOR 40430851
- Steedman, I. (1977). Marx After Sraffa.
- Vienneau, Robert L. (2024). "Characteristics of labor markets varying with perturbations of relative markups". Review of Political Economy. 36 (2): 827–843. doi:10.1080/09538259.2022.2063516.
- Zambelli, Stefano (2018). "The aggregate production function is NOT neoclassical". Cambridge Journal of Economics. 42 (2): 383–426. doi:10.1093/cje/bex011.
