= Bertram Schefold =

Swiss economist

- Born: 28 December 1943 (age 82); Basel, Switzerland
- Education: University of Basel; LMU Munich; University of Hamburg; University of Cambridge
- Known for: Theory of joint production Role in energy controversy
- Scientific career
- Fields: Economic theory Capital theory History of economic thoughts
- Thesis: Theorie der Kuppelproduktion (central part written in English, entitled: "Mr. Sraffa on Joint Production") (1971)
- Doctoral advisor: Gottfried Bombach(de); Luigi Pasinetti
- Doctoral students: Volker Caspari(de)

Bertram Schefold (born 28 December 1943 in Basel) is a Swiss economist and an Economics professor at the Goethe University in Frankfurt am Main specializing in economic theory with a particular focus on capital theory and the history of economic thought.

== Life and career ==
Schefold's father, Karl Schefold, was an archaeologist. His mother Marianne Schefold, born "von den Steinen", was the daughter of Karl von den Steinen. The family migrated in the 1930s from Germany to Switzerland. Starting his school years in Basel, he received a diploma degree in mathematics, theoretical physics and philosophy at LMU Munich, the University of Hamburg, and the University of Basel in 1967. He served for a year as President of the Verbandes der Schweizer Studierendenschaften(de) in Bern. Afterwards, he started studying Klassische Nationalökonomie(de) at the University of Basel and the University of Cambridge. After he finished his doctoral studies, he assumed a lecturer job in Basel from 1971 to 1972. Afterwards, he was a visiting scholar at Trinity College in Cambridge, as well as at Yale University. Moreover, he was a research associate at Harvard University.

Schefold has been a professor at the department of Economics at Goethe University Frankfurt since 1974 where he was also the Dean from 1981 to 1982. Since 1974, he has held many different visiting professorships: Nice 1977, 1993; Toulouse 1992, 1993; New School for Social Research New York 1984; Rome 1985; Venice 1990; and later he visited east Asia quite often. For 10 years (1981-1990) he taught different courses at the Center of Advanced Economic Studies in Triest. In 2004, he received an honorary doctoral degree from the law department of the University of Tübingen, and later in 2005, he received the honorary doctoral degree of University of Macerata in Italy. On 14 December 2010, the Ben-Gurion University of the Negev awarded him with the Thomas Guggenheim Prize in the History of Economics. Currently he is a Senior Professor at the Goethe University. Furthermore, he is an honorary member of the Stefan-George-Gesellschaft. In 2019, as a specially invited visiting scholar, Schefold went to Peking University, China. During staying in China for two months, Schefold made several speeches in Peking University, Tsinghua University and Fudan University, etc.

Since obtaining a chair at the Goethe University, Schefold has continued his work on capital theory, relating it to the classical and to the neoclassical tradition in the history of economic thought. His recent theoretical work has led to a profound modification of the so-called Cambridge debate on capital. By introducing random matrices, he was able to derive the (restrictive) conditions under which such old problems as the construction of an aggregate production function or the Marxian transformation problem can be solved rigorously.

== Engagement ==
Schefold achieved national fame with his work on energy scenarios for Germany in the 1980s and 90s, mainly in collaboration with the philosopher Klaus Michael Meyer-Abich and the physicist and philosopher Carl Friedrich von Weizsäcker. The book Die Grenzen der Atomwirtschaft, jointly with Meyer-Abich, became a bestseller (1986) and contributed to the end of the development of the breeder technology and of reprocessing in Germany. It advocated the continued use of light water reactors for a limited period of time and helped to convince the public of the need to foster the saving of energy and the development of regenerative sources on the basis of detailed prior studies of their technical and economic feasibility.

As a cofounder of the Ausschuss für Dogmengeschichte and of the European Society for the History of Economic Thought (now an Honorary President), Schefold further has become a leading exponent of this discipline. He was the managing editor of the series Klassiker der Nationalökonomie, composed of one hundred reprints, each accompanied by a volume of commentaries, which became known worldwide. For this series, he obtained the collaboration of many renowned scholars, including a number of Nobel Prize winners of economics. The series was remarkable, because it extended from Antiquity to the present and included also an Arab, a Chinese and a Japanese classic. Schefold further edited other series in the history of economic thought; his rediscovery of the German cameralist Klock deserves to be mentioned. His interest in the relationship between economics and general culture led him to study the economic contribution of literary figures. He published on the economics of Goethe and, extensively, on the economists in the circle around the poet Stefan George. George, via his poetry and his pupils, exerted a profound influence on scholars in the humanities during the first third of the 20th century, and the economists among his followers such as Edgar Salin and Kurt Singer searched for new combinations in the triangle between liberalism, anti-modernism and Marxism. Their most fruitful contribution came later, when they helped to lay the ground for the European integration. Schefold has synthesized his own historical approaches in his works on economic styles and systems.

Schefold was a member of the scientific advisory board for the publications of the Marx-Engels-Gesamtausgabe by the Internationale Marx-Engels Foundation, which is the most complete and largest collection of the works of Karl Marx and Friedrich Engels. Moreover, he counseled the German Bundestag and land parliaments on energy policy. From 1995 to 1999, Schefold was the Chairman of the Council and from 2000 to 2002, he was the president of the European Society for the history of Economic Thought, of which he is an honorary president nowadays. Besides, he works in several committees of the German Economic Association and other economic societies in Germany. Additionally, he belongs to the scientific society of the Goethe University and was a member of the board of the Frankfurter Gesellschaft für Handel, Industrie und Wissenschaft (Frankfurt Society of trade, industry and science), of which he is an honorary member currently. Furthermore, he is an honorary president of the Schweizerisch-Deutsche Wirtschaftsclub (Swiss-German economic club), whose president he was from 2000 to 2008. From 1995 to 2009, he was a chairman of the Stefan-George-Gesellschaft e.V. in Bingen, of which he is an honorary member now. Schefold has published about George, his circle and the economists accompanying him several times. Since 2017, Bertram Schefold is a Senior Fellow at the Forschungskolleg Humanwissenschaften.

== Notable publications ==
Schefold has published more than fifty books, edited several series, published more than 120 articles in academic journals, and made more than 250 contributions to collective works in several languages and disciplines, from mathematics to history and literary criticism.

Schefold has written or edited more than 50 books and was editor of several series, including:

- 2016/2017 Great Economic Thinkers [vol. I/II]. Translations from the Series Klassiker der Nationalökonomie, Routledge Studies in the History of Economics 178/190, London, New York: Routledge, 446/448 pp.
- 1991-2002 chief editor of the series Handelsblatt-Bibliothek “Klassiker der Nationalökonomie”, Düsseldorf: Verlag für Wirtschaft und Finanzen.
- 1997 Normal Prices, Technical Change and Accumulation, Studies in Political Economy, London: Macmillan, XV, 577 pp.
- 1986 with K. M. Meyer-Abich, Die Grenzen der Atomwirtschaft, Munich: Beck (four printings); licensed edn. Büchergilde Gutenberg, 231 pp.
- 1971/1989 Piero Sraffas Theorie der Kuppelproduktion, des Kapitals und der Rente, Dissertation, Basel: Privatdruck, 134 pp. / main part in English, in Mr. Sraffa on Joint Production and Other Essays, London: Unwin & Hyman (now Andover: Routledge), 392 pp.

He has also written over 120 articles in academic journals, including:

- 2016 "Profits Equal Surplus Value on Average and the significance of this result for the Marxian theory of accumulation: Being a New Contribution to Engels' Prize Essay Competition, based on random matrices and on manuscripts recently published in the MEGA for the first time", Cambridge Journal of Economics 40(1), pp. 165–199.
- 2006 with Zonghie Han, "An Empirical Investigation of Paradoxes: Reswitching and Reverse Capital Deepening in Capital Theory", Cambridge Journal of Economics 30(5), pp. 737–765.
- 1985 "Cambridge Price Theory: Special Model or General Theory of Value?" American Economic Review, Papers and Proceedings 75(2), pp. 140–145.
- 1980 "Von Neumann and Sraffa: Mathematical Equivalence and Conceptual Difference", The Economic Journal 90, pp. 140–156.
- 1976 "Different Forms of Technical Progress", Economic Journal 86, pp. 806–819.

He further has written over 250 book chapter contributions, including:

- 2013 "The Applicability of Modern Economics to Forms of Capitalism in Antiquity: Some Theoretical Considerations and Textual Evidence", in A. Slawisch (ed.), Handels- und Finanzgebaren in der Ägäis im 5. Jh. v. Chr. (= BYZAS 18. Veröffentlichungen des Deutschen Archäologischen Instituts) Istanbul, pp. 155–183.
- 2011 "Politische Ökonomie als ‘Geisteswissenschaft’. Edgar Salin und andere Ökonomen um Stefan George", in H. Hagemann (ed.), Studien zur Entwicklung der ökonomischen Theorie XXVI, Schriften des Vereins für Socialpolitik, Neue Folge Bd. 115/26, Berlin: Duncker & Humblot, pp. 149–210.
- 1999 "Use value and the ‘commercial knowledge of commodities’: Reflections on Aristotle, Savary and the Classics", in G. Mongiovi and F. Petri (eds), Value, Distribution and Capital: Essays in honour of Pierangelo Garegnani, London: Routledge, pp. 122–144.
- 1988 "Environmental Problems and Employment Opportunities", in J.A. Kregel, E. Matzner and A. Roncaglia (eds), Barriers to Full Employment, London: Macmillan, pp. 273–287.
- 1981 "Die Relevanz der Cambridge-Theorie für die ordnungspolitische Diskussion", in O. Issing (ed.), Zukunftsprobleme der Sozialen Marktwirtschaft (= Schriften des Vereins für Socialpolitik, Neue Folge Bd. 116) Berlin: Duncker & Humblot, pp. 689–715.
