= Luigi Pasinetti =

Italian economist (1930–2023)

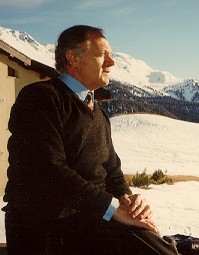
- Born: 12 September 1930; Zanica, Kingdom of Italy
- Died: 31 January 2023 (aged 92); Milan, Italy

Academic background
- Education: Università Cattolica Milano, University of Cambridge.
- Influences: Piero Sraffa, Richard Kahn.

Academic work
- Discipline: Economics
- School or tradition: Post-Keynesian economics
- Institutions: Emeritus Professor at the Università Cattolica Milano
- Notable ideas: Economic growth, Theory of value, Mathematical formulation of the Ricardian system, Pasinetti's Theorem, Vertically integrated sectors, Structural change.

Notes
- Editorial duties: Cambridge Journal of Economics, Journal of Post Keynesian Economics, Kyklos, Structural Change and Economic Dynamics

Luigi L. Pasinetti (12 September 1930 – 31 January 2023) was an Italian economist of the post-Keynesian school. Pasinetti was considered the heir of the "Cambridge Keynesians" and a student of Piero Sraffa and Richard Kahn. Along with them, as well as Joan Robinson, he was one of the prominent members on the "Cambridge, UK" side of the Cambridge capital controversy. His contributions to economics include developing the analytical foundations of neo-Ricardian economics, including the theory of value and distribution, as well as work in the line of Kaldorian theory of growth and income distribution. He also developed the theory of structural change and economic growth, structural economic dynamics and uneven sectoral development.

== Biography ==
Pasinetti was born on 12 September 1930 in Zanica, near Bergamo, in the north of Italy. He began his economics studies at Milan's Università Cattolica, where he obtained his "laurea" degree in 1954. The thesis that he presented dealt with econometric models applied to the analysis of the trade cycle. As a brilliant student, he won several scholarships for graduate studies which gained him access to University of Cambridge, England (1956 and 1958), Harvard University, United States (1957) and Oxford University, England (1959) for his graduate studies. In 1960 Oxford's Nuffield College granted him a Research Fellowship that he enjoyed until 1962, the year in which he left for the University for Cambridge, called there by the prestigious economist Lord Richard Kahn.

In those years,

When Luigi Pasinetti arrived in Cambridge as a research student, it was the proud citadel from which Keynesian economics had conquered the world. Cambridge economics was alive and well in the hands of Keynes's successors. Joan Robinson and Nicholas Kaldor were producing a steady stream of original and provocative ideas. Less visible to the outside world, Richard Kahn and Piero Sraffa were equally important among the Cambridge Keynesians. The University of Cambridge was the one European center able to maintain genuine intellectual independence and to exert considerable worldwide influence against the growing dominance of American economics. The young Italian student became in time one of the foremost Cambridge economists of his generation.

— A. Leijonhufvud

Years later, Pasinetti, remembering Kahn in a Memorial Service held at King's College Chapel, University of Cambridge on 21 October 1989, recalled that:

This is the third time, over a short span of years, that the Congregation assembles in this Chapel to commemorate, and reflect upon, the life of a major contributor to that intellectual breakthrough that has become known in the world of economics and politics as "the Keynesian Revolution". ... If one adds that another memorial service, shortly after that of Joan Robinson, was held in Cambridge, though in another Chapel, for yet another close associate of Keynes, Piero Sraffa, one cannot resist the impression that today's ceremony concludes a whole historical phase, almost an era, in the recent history of economic thought. This group of Cambridge economists had been the protagonist of one of those extraordinary and unique events in the history of ideas that decisively pushed knowledge ahead and created a break with the past.

— L. Pasinetti

Richard Goodwin was also part of this brilliant group of Cambridge economists, and exerted the first important influence on Pasinetti. In conveying the intellectual debt he owed him, Pasinetti writes:

For me, the death of *** Goodwin was a painful experience of mixed sorrow, sadness and regret. He was my first teacher in Cambridge. When, in October 1956, I arrived as a foreign research student almost ignorant of economics (and of English), innocent of all that had been going on, I noticed Joan Robinson's newly published book, The Accumulation of Capital, prominently on display in the bookshop windows. [...] He set me the task of reading, and reporting on, Knut Wicksell's Lectures, where he (rightly) thought the antecedents would be found. [...] Part of those interchanges between *** Goodwin and me found expression much later in the papers that we (separately) presented at the Frostavallen Wicksell symposium (1977).

— L. Pasinetti

In 1960–1961 Pasinetti became a Fellow of King's College. Twelve years later in 1973, he was appointed Reader at Cambridge, a post that he kept until his return to the Università Cattolica Milan in 1976. In March 1963 he was awarded his doctorate degree from Cambridge University with a PhD dissertation on "A Multi-sector Model of Economic Growth". This thesis was the core of what came to be in 1981 one of his most complete books, Structural Change and Economic Growth. In 1964 he was appointed Professor of Econometrics at the Università Cattolica and in 1981 full Professor of Economic Analysis. Trips between Cambridge and Milan were very frequent during this period. In 1971 and 1975 he was appointed Visiting Research Professor at Columbia University as well as in 1979 at the Indian Statistical Institute in Calcutta and the Delhi School of Economics.

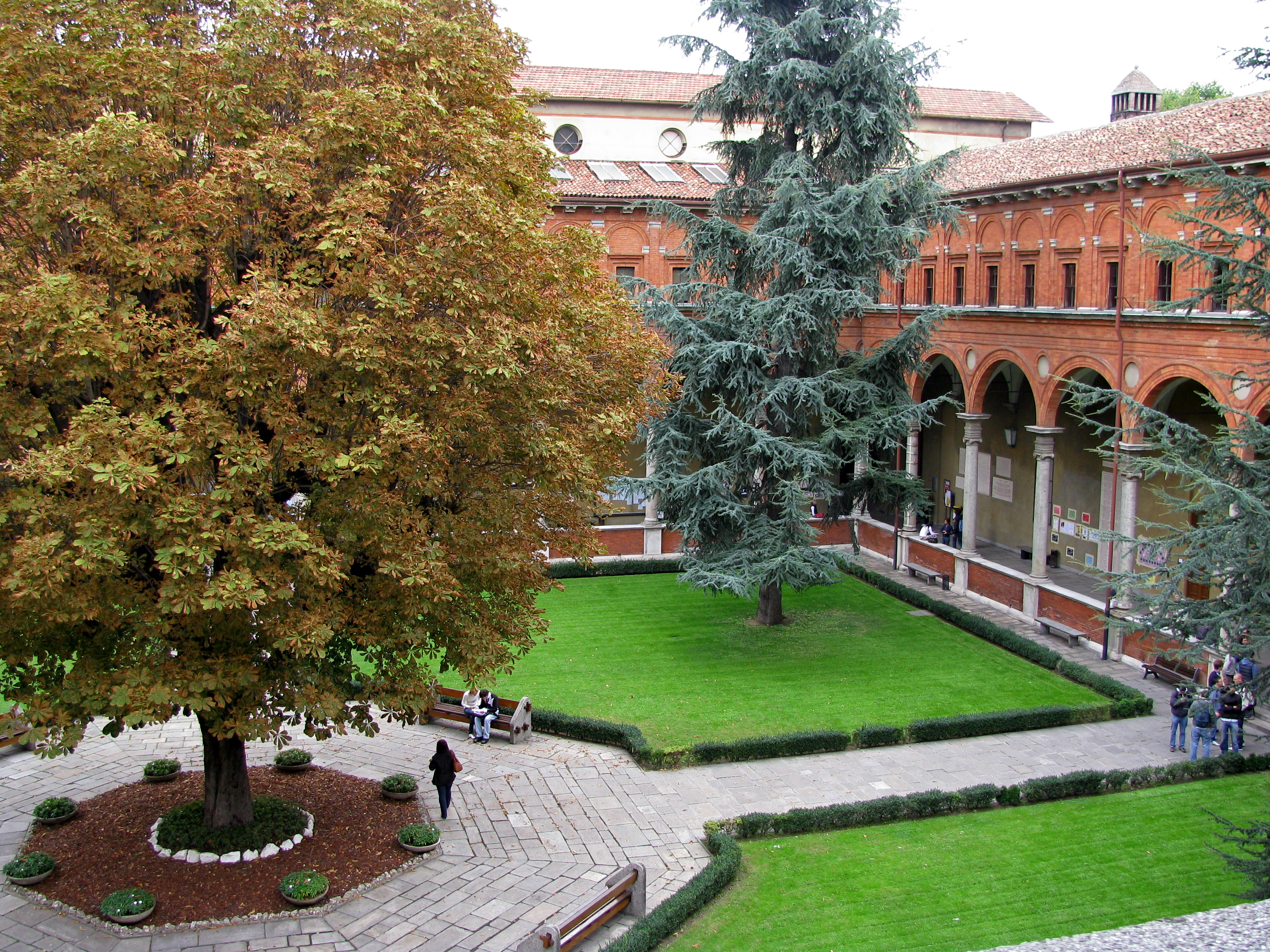
The Università Cattolica Milano was the university where Pasinetti spent most of his academic life.

Back at his Alma Mater, Università Cattolica Milan, he was appointed Chairman of the Faculty of Economics from 1980 to 1983, Director of the Department of Economics (1983–1986) and later Director of the Joint Economics Doctoral Program (comprising three Milanese universities: Università Cattolica, Bocconi University and University of Milan) from 1984 to 1986 and again from 1995 to 1998.

The list of academic distinctions and honours he has received till now is long. The most prominent ones are: St. Vincent prize for economics (1979), President of the Società Italiana degli Economisti (1986–89), President of the European Society for the History of Economic Thought (1995–1997), Member of the Executive Committee of the International Economic Association, Member of the Accademia Nazionale dei Lincei, Doctor Honoris Causa at the University of Friburg (1986), Invernizzi Prize for Economics (1997). Pasinetti was also Honorary President of: the International Economic Association, the European Society for the History of Economic Thought, the International Economic Association, the European Association for Evolutionary Political Economy, the Italian Association for the History of Political Economy and the Italian Association for the History of Economic Thought.

Pasinetti also provided valuable contributions to several major economic journals such as editorial advisor to: the Cambridge Journal of Economics (since 1977), the Journal of Post Keynesian Economics (since its founding in 1978), Kyklos (1981), Structural Change and Economic Dynamics (since 1989), and PSL Quarterly Review (2009) to name a few.

Pasinetti was Emeritus Professor at the Università Cattolica Milan.

Pasinetti died in Milan on 31 January 2023, at the age of 92.

== Theoretical contributions ==
=== A mathematical formulation of the Ricardian system ===
Pasinetti's first major contribution to economics was probably "the mathematical formulation of the Ricardian system", published in 1960 in a paper now considered classical. In such work Pasinetti presented a very concise and elegant (and pedagogically effective) analysis of the basic aspects of classical economics.

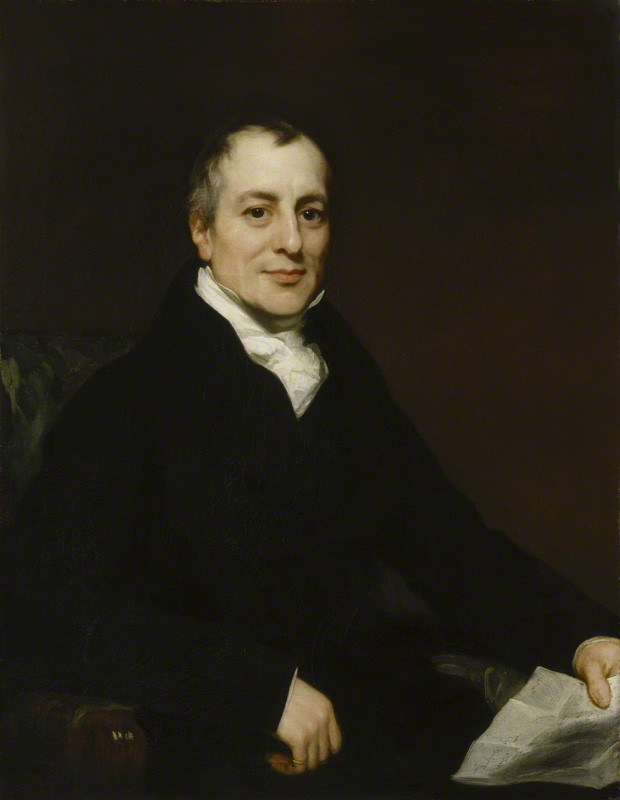
David Ricardo has been one of the most influential economists in the thinking of Pasinetti.

At that time, Piero Sraffa had just published The Works and Correspondence of David Ricardo, one of the most masterful editorial works ever to be published in economics; and scholars were wondering how Sraffa's remarkable work could clarify and enrich the interpretation of Classical economics. Pasinetti's mathematical formulation provided an answer to that question, in particular with reference to two major Classical problems: the theory of value and the theory of income distribution.

On this subject, a major stimulus came from a famous paper written by Nicholas Kaldor, in 1956, where Kaldor presented a review of the history of several theories of distribution, covering the period from Ricardo to Keynes. Although Ricardo's theory (in Kaldor's paper) was without equations, it was the starting point after which economists began to explicitly see the Ricardian model as a coherent whole, susceptible to mathematical formalization.

Another influence came directly from Sraffa and concerned the relative prices of goods produced in the economic system made to depend only on the amount of labour embodied in them – the well known labour theory of value. In fact, an early draft of Pasinetti's paper was read by Sraffa, who gave his approval to almost the entire paper:

I myself remember that, when I returned to my college after submitting to his attention an early draft of my mathematical formulation of the Ricardian system, a friend immediately asked me: ‘Have you now thrown it into the paper basket?’ At my answer, ‘I have, but only the first section; the major part of the work seems to stand’, the surprised reply was, ‘Well, if it has gone through Sraffa's scrutiny, it will hold for good.

— L. Pasinetti

Pasinetti explains that "the more constructive approach is taken of stating explicitly the assumptions needed in order to eliminate the ambiguities" in the Ricardian model, hence, the reason for the mathematical formulation.

In this view, the most straightforward mathematical Ricardian model that can be formulated, with minimal economic complications, is the one in which only one commodity is produced (‘corn’ for instance), and where there are three social classes: capitalists who earn profits, workers who earn wages and landowners whose income comes from the rent of land. This is the way to express Kaldor's model mentioned above. Although the Pasinetti model is more general and comprises two sectors (agriculture and manufacturing), it is illuminating to start with the simplest version –a one-commodity model expressed by the following equations:

$Y = f(N) \,$ (1.1)

$f(0) \geq 0$ (1.1a)

$f'(0) > \mu \,$ (1.1a)

$f''(N) < 0 \,$ (1.1a)

Equation (1.1) shows that output, Y, depends only on the number of workers, N, engaged to work on the land. Three conditions (1.1a) are necessary and help to restrict the meaning of (1.1). Specifically, the first displays that land, when workers are not employed, can produce something or nothing at all. The second condition shows that the marginal product to kick start the cultivation of land must be greater than μ, the subsistence wage; otherwise the system will never start working. The third condition shows the diminishing returns of labour. The following equations show the determination of the quantities of different categories of income:

$W = N \cdot x\,$ (1.2)

$K = W \,$ (1.3)

$R = f(N) - N \cdot f'(N)\,$ (1.4)

$B = Y - R - N \cdot x \,$ (1.5)

where W are the total wages, x is the wage per worker, K is the capital of the economy, R is the total rents perceived by landowners and B are the total profits that go into the hands of capitalists. The latter are represented as a residual income once the rents and wages have been paid. In these models all the capital is working capital; it is assumed to be composed entirely of advances to workers as wages. Notice, moreover, that expression (1.4), supplemented by technical conditions (1.1a), expresses what still today is called the Ricardian theory of rent.

Hitherto we need two more equations to close the model. They are:

$x = \mu \,$ (1.6)

$K = \overline{K} \,$ (1.7)

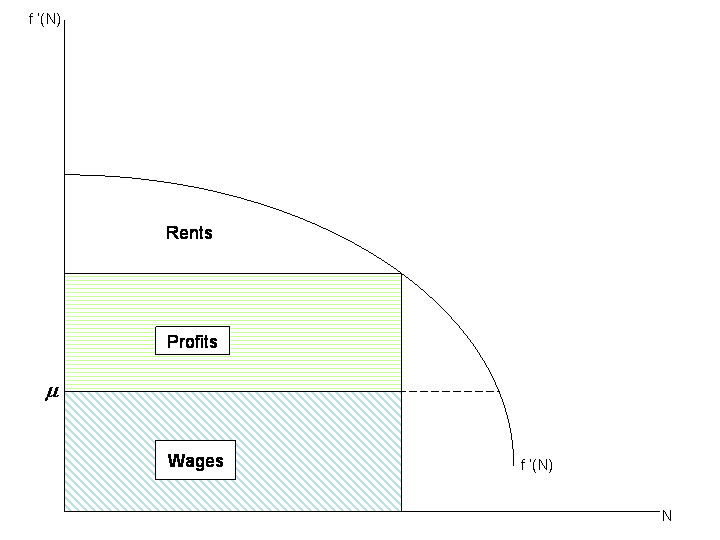
Distribution of income in the Ricardian system in terms of marginal product.

Equation (1.6) shows that long-term wages tend to subsistence level. Equation (1.7) shows the stock of capital at the beginning of the year. Throughout the construction of his model, Pasinetti insists that he is interested in "natural solutions" of the Ricardian model, i.e., those to which the system tends to in the long term.

Thus, equation (1.6) does not preclude short-term wage deviations with respect to its natural level. Eventually, note that μ is the only magnitude which is determined from outside the system: it is an amount set by customs and habits of society. This means that the number of workers employed (proportional to population), is determined by the system itself, unlike what happens in modern theories of economic growth, where the rate of population growth is taken as exogenously given.

The previous model allows us to see the basic features of Ricardo's distribution theory. However, no reference can be made to anything about the theory of value, since all the magnitudes are measured in terms of ‘corn’. As Pasinetti says: "where any question of evaluation has not yet arisen, corn being the single commodity produced". However, by enlarging the model to a two-sector model, more remarkable features of Ricardian economics emerge. The two sectors include: the basic goods sector (wage goods called ‘corn’) and a luxury goods sector (called ‘gold’). The whole new model appears as:

$X_1 = f(N_1)\,$ (2.1)

$f(0) \geq 0$ (2.1a)

$f'(0) > \mu \,$ (2.1a)

$f''(N) < 0 \,$ (2.1a)

$R = f(N_1)-N_1 \cdot f'(N_1)\,$ (2.2)

$W = N \cdot x \,$ (2.3)

$K = W \,$ (2.4)

$P_1 = X_1-R-N_1 \cdot x \,$ (2.5)

$x = \mu \,$ (2.6)

$K = \overline{K} \,$ (2.7)

$X_2 = \alpha\ \cdot N_2 \,$ (2.8)

$N_1+N_2 = N \,$ (2.9)

Equations (2.1) to (2.7) are identical to those of the single sector model, but now they bear added subscripts to differentiate the production of ‘corn’ from that of ‘gold’. Equation (2.8) presents the gold production function which, unlike the ‘corn’ production function, exhibits constant returns to scale. The parameter is the physical amount of ‘gold’ produced by a worker in a year. The next two equations show in monetary (nominal terms) the wage rate (‘corn’) per worker and the rate of profit:

$w = x \cdot p_1 \,$ (2.10)

$\pi\ = \frac{P_1 \cdot p_1+P_2 \cdot p_2}{K \cdot p_1} \,$ (2.11)

where p_{1} and p_{2} represent the price of ‘corn’ and the price of ‘gold’ respectively. Pasinetti supposes that the wage rate and the rate of profit are identical in both sectors thanks to free market competition. Note also from (2.10) that only p_{1} (the price of corn) enters wage determination, since it is assumed that workers in both sectors only receive only 'corn' as wages; in a terminology later developed by Sraffa, ‘corn’ is the only basic commodity produced in the system. The same consideration can be made, from the opposite view, looking at (2.11), since the only capital involved is represented by advances in the form of ‘corn’. Hence K appears as multiplied by p_{1}. The following two equations are Ricardo's implicit assumptions -that the "natural price" of any good is given by its cost of production:

$P_2 \cdot p_2 = X_2 \cdot p_2-N_2 \cdot w \,$ (2.12)

$\frac{p_2 \cdot X_2}{N_2} = \frac{p_1 \cdot (X_1-R)}{N_1} \,$ (2.13)

Equation (2.12) allows the determination of the total monetary profitsof the gold industry. Equation (2.13) is much more important. It shows that on balance, the value of output per worker is the same in both sectors. The product of sector 1 (agriculture) is considered free of rents. To achieve this result, both the wage rate and the rate of profit have been considered homogeneous in both sectors, and the capital/labour ratio must also be considered as identical.

Pasinetti closes the model with two further equations:

$\alpha\ \cdot p_2 = 1 \,$ (2.14)

$p_2 \cdot X_2 = p_1 \cdot R \,$ (2.15)

Relationship (2.14) simply adopts the amount of ‘gold’ as numeràire; hence, it is equal to unity. Relation (2.15) displays the income distribution between the different social classes. Ricardo supposes that workers spend their entire wages to buy 'corn', capitalists reinvest their profits in capital accumulation, and landowners spend all their rents on luxury goods. The simplicity of this argument about consumption functions for each social class enables Pasinetti to close the whole circuit of income distribution with a single equation. Specifically, (2.15) shows that landowners spend all their income received as rents, p_{1}R, in the buying of luxury goods, p_{2}X_{2}. There is no need for more equations, since "the determination of the demand for one of the two commodities (gold in our example) also determines, implicitly, the demand for the other commodity (corn), since total output is already functionally determined".

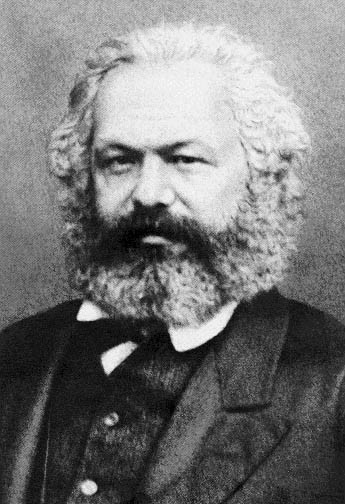
In his theory of labor value Marx also supposes an identical labor-capital ratio in all sectors.

The system presented above (15 equations with 15 unknowns) displays the natural solutions of the Ricardian economic system, i.e. those solutions attained in the long term and corrected for market distortions and imbalances in the short term. Ricardo did not deny the existence of such deviations, but for his analysis, they were not the relevant issues. These solutions, furthermore, as demonstrated mathematically by Pasinetti exist, they are unique, and, moreover, their steady state solutions are stable. On the other hand, it can be demonstrated that if we take the partial derivatives of all variables with respect to K, (because the process of capital accumulation is what matters for the dynamics of the model) the evolution of the variables is consistent with the conclusions which Ricardo reached; especially with the tendency of the whole economic system in the long run towards a stationary state.

The above model has several outstanding aspects. The foremost of which is a theory of income distribution entirely independent of the theory of value. The inclusion of a new sector -and consequently the whole structure of relative prices- have not even slightly changed the way income is distributed among landowners, workers and capitalists. At the same time, prices though of course not equal to, are exactly proportional to the quantity of labour embodied in each commodity. This is a perfectly clear labour theory of value.

The attentive reader may notice that the two major results (on income distribution and on value respectively) depend on two assumptions that are implicit in the formulation of the model, i.e. of the above set of equations, namely: 1) that capitalist appropriate the whole surplus of the economic system, after paying rents to landowners, and conventional wages to workers; and 2) that the proportion of labour to capital is exactly the same in all sectors. These two assumptions have given rise to endless discussions on value and distribution ever since.

Further work undertaken by Pasinetti's has been concerned with reversing the causal chain of the first assumption and in rendering the second assumption superfluous.

=== The Cambridge equation and Pasinetti's theorem ===
Kaldor's 1956 article already mentioned above ("Alternative Theories of Distribution") was at the origin of another ‘seminal’ paper written by Pasinetti. Kaldor had reviewed the major theories of distribution throughout the history of economics from Ricardo to the Marginalists and even to Kalecki. But then, he added a theory which he named the Keynesian theory of income distribution. This was a surprise because these issues were never treated by Keynes in an explicit way. Kaldor baptized his theory as ‘Keynesian’ because it succeeded in catching a few important concepts both from Keynes's Treatise's widow's cruse allegory and from Kalecki's profits equation.

In any case, in this paper Kaldor reached remarkable results. Starting from a closed economic system, without government, and in which there are capitalists and workers, starting from the saving-investment identity, Kaldor came to the following identity between investments and savings:

$I=\displaystyle s_wY+(s_c-s_w)P$

where Y is the national income, P is the volume of total profits, s_{w} is the workers propensity to save, s_{c} is the capitalists’ propensity to save and I is investment. If we suppose that workers do not save (s_{w}=0), divide both members by K and remember that in dynamic equilibrium I/K = g_{n}, we get:

$\frac{P}{Y}= \frac{g_n}{s_c}k$ (3.1)

$\frac{P}{K}= \frac{g_n}{s_c}$ (3.2)

where g_{n} is the natural rate of growth and k is the capital/output ratio. Finally, note that these two expressions only have economic significance in the range:

$s_w<\frac{I}{Y}<s_c$

This interval excludes equilibrium with negative shares, either by the workers (first inequality) or by the capitalists (second inequality). The expressions (3.1) and (3.2) are those that have subsequently formed the core of the post-Keynesian distribution theory; but only after an extremely hard-fought debate. Equation (3.1) shows that the share of profitsin total output depends positively on the natural rate of growth and the capital/output ratio and negatively on the propensity to save of the capitalist class. The second of these relations, (3.2), better known as the "Cambridge equation", shows that the profit rate is solely determined by the ratio of the natural rate of growth and the propensity to save of capitalists.

The importance of these expressions became clear only after an intense debate. These expressions were achieved with an additional assumption that was heavily criticized. Kaldor's assumption was that the workers propensity to save was zero.

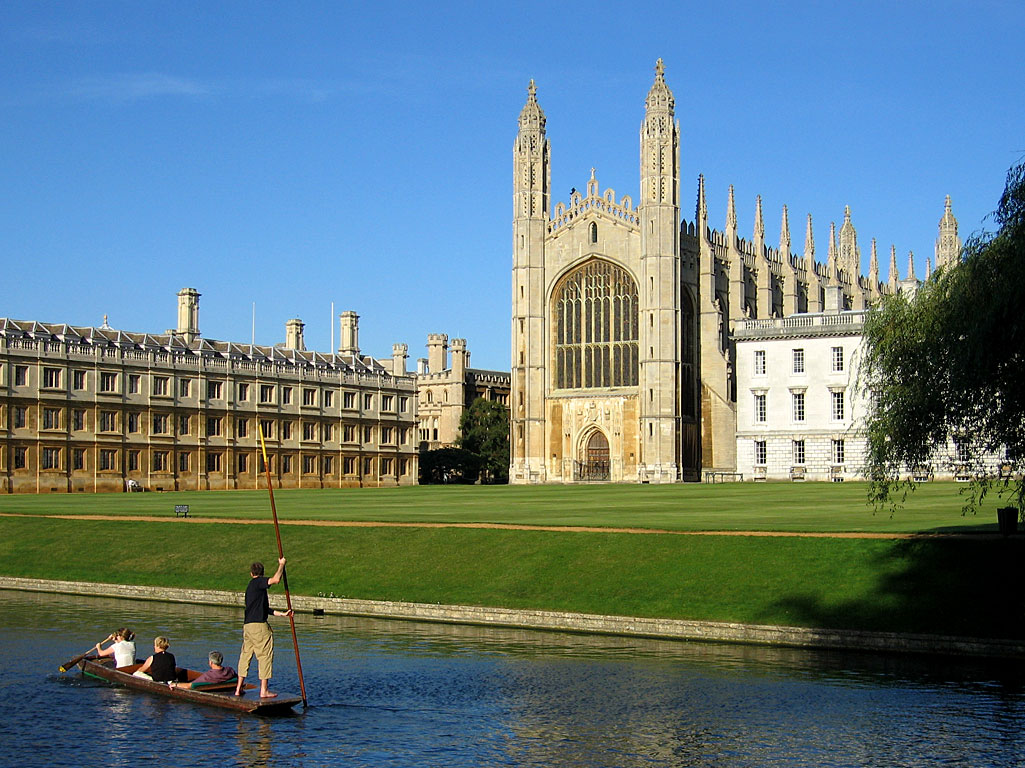
King's College, University of Cambridge.

Specifically, if you eliminate this assumption, the above formulas lose their conciseness, depending on the propensity to save of workers. This assumption was explicitly criticized because, whatever justification it might have had in the early days of industrialization, it appeared to have no sense in contemporary times. If you eliminate this assumption, the above formulas lose not only their conciseness, but also their applicability to the industrial systems of our own days.

Pasinetti went into this debate with his 1962 paper. With his now famous Pasinetti Theorem, he achieved the result of re-stating Kaldor's original equations without the need to rely on Kaldor's much criticized assumptions. It is worth quoting the first time that Pasinetti presented his views about these issues to an audience:

I dared, while being the youngest member, to present the results of my work on income distribution (Pasinetti, 1962) to a session of the so-called ‘Secret Seminar’ in King's College (a post-war version of Keynes's more famous Circus)-a unique experience for me. I presented my results as a criticism of Kaldor's theory. The members of the audience were stunned, or suspicious, or disbelieving, with one exception: Nicky Kaldor. He was extraordinarily quick in grasping the gist of the idea and in seeing that the concession of his having fallen into a ‘logical slip’ led to a generalization of the post-Keynesian (in fact of Kaldor's) theory of income distribution and moreover to a new, long-run, Keynesian theory of the rate of profits.

— L. Pasinetti

In his 1962 paper, Pasinetti showed that Kaldor had fallen into a "logical slip". He implicitly assumed that the total profits only came from the capitalists and he neglected the workers. In other words, "By attributing all profits to the capitalists it has inadvertently but necessarily implied that worker's savings are always totally transferred as a gift to the capitalists". That is to say the saving function of Kaldor's model ought to be modified so as to include both workers’ profits and capitalist profits, i.e.:

$\displaystyle P=P_w+P_c$

Under this assumption the Investment = Savings identity becomes:

$I = \displaystyle s_wY +(s_c-s_w)P_c$

If this expression is cleared as before, we see that formal results are similar to (3.1) and (3.2), but now they only refer to that part of profits that accrue to the capitalists. Specifically, the modified Cambridge equation would take this peculiar form:

$\frac{P_c}{K}= \frac{1}{s_c - s_w} \cdot \frac{I}{K}- \frac{s_w}{s_c - s_w} \cdot \frac{Y}{K}$

Note that the preceding equation now shows not the profit rate of the economy, P/K, but a ratio, P_{c} /K, which has no economic significance if taken as such. To fix this anomaly, Pasinetti added P_{w} /K, to both sides of the equality:

$\frac{P}{K}= \frac{1}{s_c - s_w} \cdot \frac{I}{K}- \frac{s_w}{s_c - s_w} \cdot \frac{Y}{K}+ \frac{P_w}{K} \Rightarrow \frac{P}{K}= \frac{1}{s_c - s_w} \cdot \frac{I}{K}- \frac{s_w}{s_c - s_w} \cdot \frac{Y}{K}+ \frac{i \cdot K_w}{K}$

To complete the formulation, Pasinetti simply assumes that, in the long-term, the variable i, representing the interest rate earned by workers when they lend their savings to capitalists, is equal to the profit rate, P/K. Taking that into account and simplifying, we obtain:

$\frac{P}{K}= \frac{g_n}{s_c}$ (3.2)

i.e., exactly the preceding (3.2) equation. In other words, we obtain the "Cambridge equation" again, but this time without the assumption s_{w} = 0. By a similar procedure Pasinetti shows that the share of total profits in total income again emerges the same as (3.1); i.e., the Pasinetti Theorem proves that in the long run, the propensity to save of the workers has no effect on the determination of the overall profit rate of the economy, and also has no effect on the determination of the share of the total profits in the national income. At the same time, however, the propensity to save of the workers determines the distribution of profits between workers and capitalists.

With these outcomes, the truly important point is that Kaldor's original formulae are much more general than was previously believed. As Pasinetti says, "the irrelevance of worker's propensity to save gives the model a much wider generality than was hitherto believed. Since the rate of profit and the income distribution between profits and wages are determined independently of s_{w}, there is no need for any hypothesis whatever on the aggregate savings behaviour of the workers."

The conclusions obtained from Pasinetti's Theorem led to a huge number of scientific works and papers, with the purpose of clarifying the nature of the Theorem and its more important implications. Specifically, in 1966, Paul A. Samuelson and Franco Modigliani, the MIT economists, wrote a detailed and widely quoted paper where they tried to minimize the consequences of the Pasinetti Theorem and to lessen the generality of its conclusions.

The argument centered on the inequality shown above, crucial to the solution of the Cambridge equation, namely on:

$s_w<\frac{I}{Y}<s_c$

Samuelson and Modigliani proposed that the following inequality (which they called anti-Pasinetti's inequality) was also reasonable, and claimed that it would endow the model with greater generality:

$s_w \geq \frac{I}{Y} \to s_w \geq g_nk$

Such inequality, however, requires that the workers' propensity to save becomes so high as to allow them to accumulate capital at a greater speed than capitalists. If this were to happen, in the end the total capital of the economy would entirely be owned by the workers, while the capitalists would disappear.

The formulation of the anti-Pasinetti range and all theoretical justification (and some empirical exercises) proposed by Samuelson and Modigliani was challenged by Pasinetti and in a much more critical way by Kaldor and Joan Robinson.

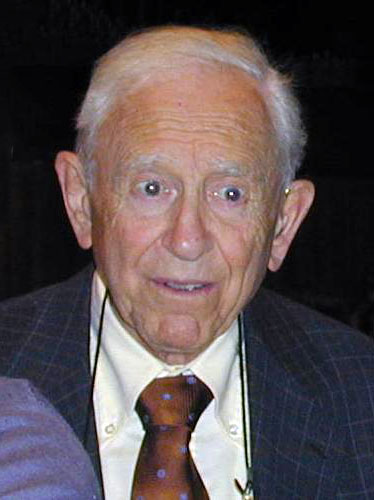
Franco Modigliani.

Kaldor founded his criticism on the lack of realism of the assumptions made by Samuelson and Modigliani, while performing a remarkable study on the empirical values of the saving propensities of workers and capitalists (based on data from National Accounts for United States and United Kingdom). Kaldor concluded that, "unless they make a more imaginative effort to reconcile their theoretical framework with the known facts of experience, their economic theory is bound to remain a barren exercise."

Pasinetti preferred, with his reply to Samuelson and Modigliani, to remain at a higher level of analysis – by pointing out the weaknesses of the logical analysis of the two MIT economists. Nonetheless Pasinetti joined Kaldor's critique concerning the highly restrictive assumptions made by the neoclassical economists:

Solow, for instance blithely goes on to add a whole series of other assumptions which Harrod and Domar do not make: a differentiable linear and homogeneous production function, perfect and infinite substitutability of labour and capital, perfect competition in the labour and in the capital markets, etc... [...] The extraordinary feature of these assumptions is that they are not only numerous, but peculiarly hybrid, opposite and extreme."

— L. Pasinetti

For Pasinetti, the principal issue of the debate is the way in which technology is defined. If s_{w} < g_{n}K/Y the Cambridge equation would still stand, regardless of which assumption is made about the technology (i.e., whatever the form of the production function), while if s_{w} > g_{n}K/Y, the shape of technology does play a crucial role, so that "The Meade-Samuelson-Modigliani's marginal productivity results only follow on particular and unacceptable assumptions on technology."

Pasinetti went on to argue that, even with the particular and unacceptable assumptions on technology, the Samuelson-Modigliani range of applicability would hardly have any practical significance. In fact, even though the Cambridge equation might not exactly determine the rate of profits, it would nevertheless determine its upper limit. First, the rate of profit (whatever way it is determined) cannot be higher than g_{n}/s_{c}. Secondly, the rate of profit cannot be lower than g_{n} (for, if it were, that would mean that individuals would contribute more to economic growth than they receive in exchange for profits, which is patently an absurdity).

So, even if in the range of Samuelson and Modigliani the rate of profit were to be determined by the marginal productivities (and not by the Cambridge equation as in the general case), its scope would be extremely limited, being confined to a quasi knife-edge range:

$g_n<r<\frac{g_n}{s_c}$

=== The Cambridge equation with the public sector ===
Already in the 70's the debate of the original Pasinetti Theorem, and hence the Samuelson-Modigliani's interval, took a turning point, by reaching a second phase in which "many authors proceeded to relax assumptions, trying out new hypotheses and introducing complications of all sorts". Indeed, already in the 60s some economists, inspired by Kaldor's paper of 1966, began to introduce in the Cambridge model some issues related to financial assets, interest rates and the functioning of financial markets and big corporations. All these contributions, as well as those which were made later in the 1970s and 1980s, were made in order to give the Cambridge model a wider applicability and more explicit realism.

It was in 1972, thanks to a remarkable paper by Steedman, that the public sector was explicitly included in the Cambridge equation. Though 16 years had elapsed since the original paper by Kaldor, no formal attempt had been made in that period to introduce the government sector and its ensuing complications. The case is more striking if one considers that Kaldor was an expert adviser on tax issues, tax theory and public finance. This is due to the aforementioned fact that throughout that period the economists were mainly concerned about the analytical properties of the outcome of the Pasinetti Theorem.

In fact, Steedman's 1972 paper was an original and very constructive way to resolve the theoretical dispute between Pasinetti and Samuelson-Modigliani. Steedman showed that if the public sector was considered, under the assumption of budget equilibrium, the long run solutions were consistent with Pasinetti's solutions, and never with the "dual" solutions of Samuelson-Modigliani. This means that the introduction of the public sector meant that the profit rate remained independent of the workers propensity to save and of the capital-output ratio (technology).

The "enlarged Cambridge equation" at which Steedman arrived was:

$\frac{P}{K}= \frac{g_n}{(1-t_p)s_c}$ (3.3)

where t_{p} is the tax rate (average and marginal) on profits. In the case that t_{p}=0 (there are no taxes on profits), we obtain the original Cambridge equation. As it can be easily seen, neither the workers' propensity to save, nor technology, nor even the tax rate on wages affect to the rate of profit of the economy, and hence they do not affect to the distribution between wages and profits.

Pasinetti entered the debate again in 1989 showing that -whether the government's budget was in deficit or surplus- the main results of the Cambridge equation hold. If the government budget was not balanced, the Cambridge equation would take the following form:

$\frac{P}{K}= \frac{g_n}{(1-t_p)s'_c}$ (3.4)

where s’_{c} is a "propensity to save of capitalists corrected", meaning that it takes into account both the direct taxation on profits and the indirect taxation, t_{i} (on capitalists' consumption) as well as the government propensity to save, s_{T}, i.e.:

$s'_c= s_c \cdot (1 - t_p) + s_T \cdot \alpha \cdot [t_p + t_i \cdot (1 - s_c) \cdot (1 - t_p)]$

Although the expression of the capitalists’ propensity to save is not as simple as the original, the truly remarkable thing is that no matter what hypothesis are adopted about the government budget, the Cambridge equation continues to hold, by depending on the natural rate of growth divided by the capitalists' propensity to save, independently of workers' propensity to save and the technology.

Equation (4.1) - and (4.2) - can be viewed from another point of view: they can be expressed in terms of profit after taxes:

$\frac{P}{K}(1-t_p)= \frac{g_n}{s'_c}$

The long-run rate of profits is given by the natural growth rate divided by the capitalists’ propensity to save, independently of anything else. That is to say, the original Cambridge equation can be said to refer to the rate of profit net of taxes, not to the rate of profit before taxes.

The most important conclusion to be drawn from this analysis is that if we consider two identical economies (with the same natural rate of growth and saving propensities), if the first has a higher tax rate on profits, the second economy will enjoy a higher rate of profits before taxes (and also a higher share of profits in total income). That is to say, the presence of government has a redistributive effect per se in favour of profits and against wages. This important and surprising conclusion should not sound new, for, as stated by Pasinetti:

This is the theory that Kaldor consistently proposed in all his abundant works on taxation. As he openly acknowledged (Kaldor, 1956), the theory is in line with Classical economic analysis, but with a dramatic reversal of the chain of causation. As is well known, Ricardo took wages as exogenously given and concluded that all taxes on wages are eventually shifted on to profits. For Kaldor, the opposite is the case. Profits, by being the source of the savings that are necessary to sustain the exogenously given full-employment investments, have a sort of prior claim on income. Thus, for Kaldor, all taxes on profits are eventually shifted on to wages."

— L. Pasinetti

=== Controversy on the theory of capital ===
Alongside the contributions made to the Cambridge model of growth and income distribution, in the 1960s, Pasinetti joined what has become known in economic literature as the controversy on capital theory between the two Cambridges: i.e., Cambridge (United Kingdom), whose most prominent scholars were Joan Robinson, Luigi Pasinetti, Piero Sraffa and Nicholas Kaldor and Cambridge, Massachusetts, whose members were Paul Samuelson, Robert Solow, David Levhari and Edwin Burmeister.

Controversies over the nature and importance of capital were not new. In the early 20th century, the economist John Bates Clark, in an effort to refute Marx's surplus theory, suggested that wages and profits (or rather interest, as they were called by Neoclassical economists, owing to their assumption that rate of profit and rate of interest coincide) were simply considered as prices, obtained from the marginal productivity of the factors of production; a theory synthesized by J.B. Clark's famous statement, that "what a social class gets is, under natural law, what it contributes to the general output of industry". In this debate, Veblen and Böhm-Bawerk were also involved, proposing slightly different, but basically similar, theories to that of J. B. Clark.

In 1930 Hayek re-opened the debate by linking lower interest rates with more indirect methods of production, i.e., with higher capital/labor ratios. Since the interest rate was for Hayek the price of capital, it was clear that Hayek (as all Neoclassical economists) thought that lower interest rates would lead to more capital-intensive production methods. With the outbreak of the Great Depression, the debates over capital theory were abandoned, and it was not until 1953, due to a paper by Joan Robinson, that the topic was again given prominence.

Robinson opened the controversy with a now famous statement, with which she exposes the main problems of the traditional concept of capital as follows:

Moreover, the production function has been a powerful instrument of miseducation. The student of economic theory is taught to write O $=$ f(L,C), where L is a quantity of labour, C a quantity of capital and O a rate of output of commodities. He is instructed to assume all workers alike, and to measure L in man-hours of labour; he is told something about the index-number problem involved in choosing a unit of output; and then he is hurried on to the next question, in the hope that he will forget to ask in what units C is measured. Before ever he does ask, he has become a professor, and so sloppy habits of thought are handed on from one generation to the next.

— J. Robinson

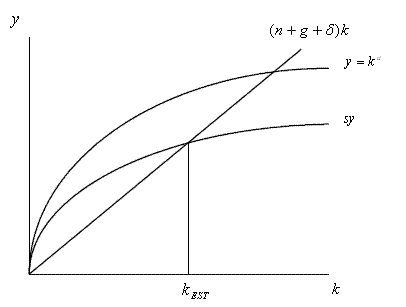
A neoclassical production function.

Although initially the debate was focused on the measurement of capital, more basic questions quickly began to emerge concerning the validity of the neoclassical production functions. If capital could be measured in some way, and if one assumed constant returns to scale, diminishing marginal productivities, given technology, competitive equilibrium and the production of a single good, the production function allowed getting three noteworthy conclusions:

1. A rate of interest determined by the marginal productivity of capital.
2. A monotonic inverse relationship between the rate of profit and the capital-labor ratio, namely the possibility of relating the rate of profit to the listing of a set of monotonically ordered production techniques.
3. A distribution of income between wages and profits explained by the marginal productivities of the factors of production, as related to their scarcity.

The assumption of the production of a single good was crucial, as it allowed the measurement of capital in physical units while no valuation problem arose. However, in a model with many goods (heterogeneous capital), the possibility of aggregation could not be avoided and always remained very problematic.

In 1962 Paul Samuelson wrote an important paper, which preceded and in fact provoked the subsequent debate. He proposed to solve the problem of the aggregation of capital through a new concept, the surrogate production function. "What I propose to do here is to show that a new concept, the ‘surrogate production function’, can provide some rationalization for the validity of the simple J. B. Clark parables which pretend there is a single thing called ‘capital’ that can be put into a single production function and along with labor will produce total output."

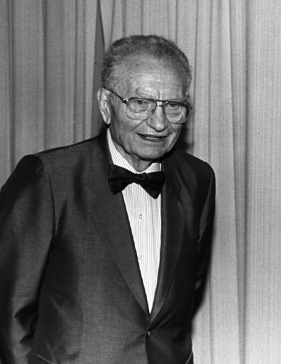
Paul Samuelson.

The problem is that in this way, in order to add capital and put it into an aggregate production function, one must assess the capital as a stream of discounted monetary flows to be produced in the future; which implies an interest rate. The possibly adverse effects of changes in interest rates on capital value are basically two: the re-adoption of earlier discarded techniques (reswitching) and capital reversing.

Reswitching is basically the possibility that the same method of production may became the most profitable one at more than one rate of profit, i.e., a production method may become the most profitable one both at low and at high rates of return, even when in the medium range it is dominated by other methods.

Capital-reversing occurs when moving from one technique to another, the technique chosen at a lower level of the rate of profit requires less capital value while earlier it required more capital value.

Pasinetti published a famous article in the Symposium of the Quarterly Journal of Economics in 1966, which was actually an adaptation and expansion of an article that was presented to the First World Congress of the Econometric Society in Rome one year earlier. Pasinetti set out to show that the theorem stated a year earlier by David Levhari and Paul Samuelson, which was supposed to demonstrate the impossibility of reswitching at the aggregate level, was false. Although in 1960 Sraffa had shown that reswitching was a possibility, no one had considered in depth such contribution. As Pasinetti said at the beginning of his 1966 article:

Among the results that Piero Sraffa published a few years ago, there is a remarkable one on the problem of choice of techniques, in an economic system in which commodities are produced by commodities and labor. Mr. Sraffa showed that, if we consider all those technical methods for producing the same commodity which can become most profitable at least at one particular income distribution (and leave aside all those which are inferior to others at all possible income distributions), it is not possible in general to order them in such a way that their choice is a monotonic function of the rate of profit, as the latter is varied from zero to its maximum.

— L.Pasinetti

Later he adds: "This result, owing to its theoretical implications, has been rather worrying; and there has been a general reluctance to consider it."

The paper begins by setting a numerical example that shows -by constructing two alternative techniques- that even satisfying all Levhari and Samuelson hypotheses, reswitching is a possibility at the aggregate level. Then Pasinetti set up a theoretical analysis to find out where the error was in Levhari's proof. Clearly, if the numerical example above refuted the theorem –as it did-, "It means that their logical arguments must have gone wrong at some stage".

The conclusions of the article were truly remarkable, for if a monotonic relationship between profit rate and capital-labour ratio could not hold, the production function concept was meaningless. Therefore, he concluded that:

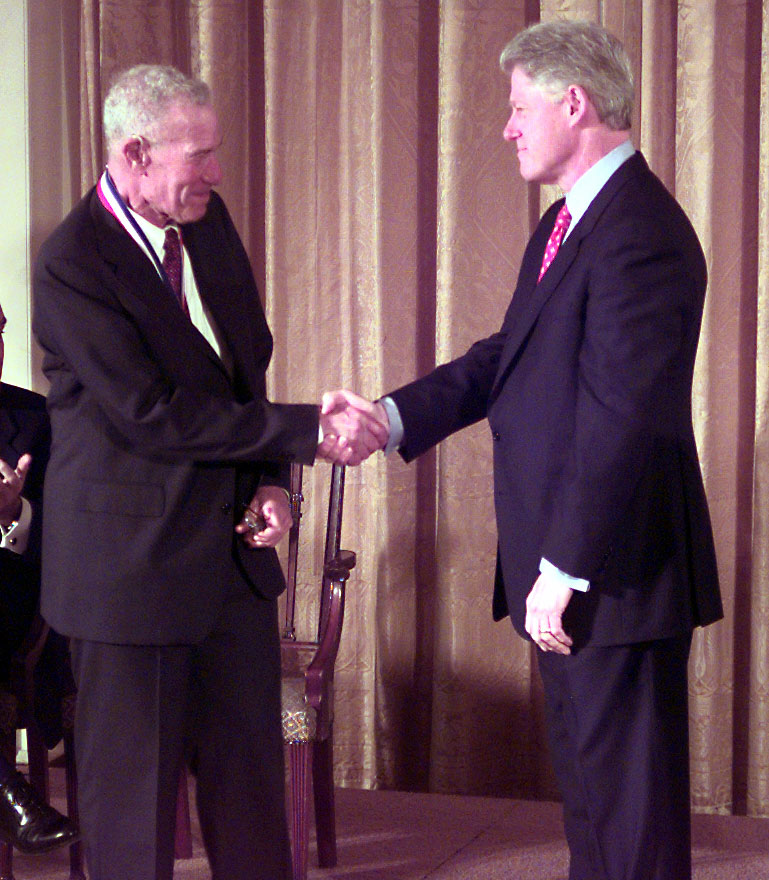
Robert Solow.

The foregoing analysis shows that this is not necessarily so; there is no connection that can be expected in general between the direction of change of the rate of profit and the direction of change of the "quantity of capital" per man.

— L. Pasinetti

Pasinetti's other major contribution to the debate on capital theory was a 1969 paper titled "Switches of Technique and the ‘Rate of Return’ in Capital Theory". In this paper, Pasinetti showed that the concept of the rate of return on capital, introduced by Irving Fisher, and resumed and used by Solow in 1967 as a means of rescuing the neoclassical capital theory, had no economic significance.

Whichever of the two definitions given by Fisher on the rate of return was accepted, one of them was an accounting expression and in the other (in order to say anything on interest) would entail accepting a rather unobtrusive postulate in order to avoid the problem of reswitching. That is, the concept of "rate of return", which Solow thought was the central concept of the theory of capital, had no autonomous theoretical content. The conclusion of the article is an illuminating summary of the results concerning the debate on the theory of capital:

The implications of the phenomenon of reswitching of techniques for marginal capital theory appear to be the more serious the deeper one goes in uncovering them and bringing them out into the open. The initial result of no general relationship between rate of profit and value of capital goods per man came to contradict the marginal-theory interpretation of the rate of profit as a selector of capital intensity[…] Further investigation now reveals that another traditional notion, that of ‘rate of return’, is devoid of any autonomous theoretical content.

— L. Pasinetti

=== Lectures on the Theory of Production ===
Lectures on the Theory of Production first appeared in Italian in 1975. Already in 1956 some parts of the book circulated in the form of lecture notes in several Italian universities. The insistence of students to give these notes a more structured and compact form prompted Pasinetti to compile these lectures, enlarging them and then bringing them to the form in which the book appeared.

This is the main reason why the Lectures on the Theory of Production turned out to be the most successful of his publications didactically (translated in French, Spanish, German and Japanese). The English version, appeared two years later, in 1977 and maintained the character and the structure of the Italian version, although Pasinetti added some enlargements, in the form of more sections and new appendices.

At a theoretical level, Lectures on the Theory of Production is a book dedicated to the analysis of the theory of production, that is, the way in which societies produce wealth and then how it is distributed. It is curious to notice the unusual way in which Pasinetti introduced his Theory of Production. He begins Chapter I by contrasting two possible definitions of wealth:

The concept of "wealth" appears, at first sight, to be perfectly clear and familiar. It is traditionally defined as "the abundance of goods and services at the disposal of an individual or of a community" […] The principal distinction to be made is that "abundance of goods" might mean an endowment, or fund, of existing goods, i.e., wealth as a stock of commodities or claims, or it might mean a sizable periodic flow of goods and services, i.e., wealth as a flow of commodities or income. These two meanings are often confused, even today.

— L. Pasinetti

Quesnay's Tableau Economique is considered the theoretical background of modern Input-Output analysis.

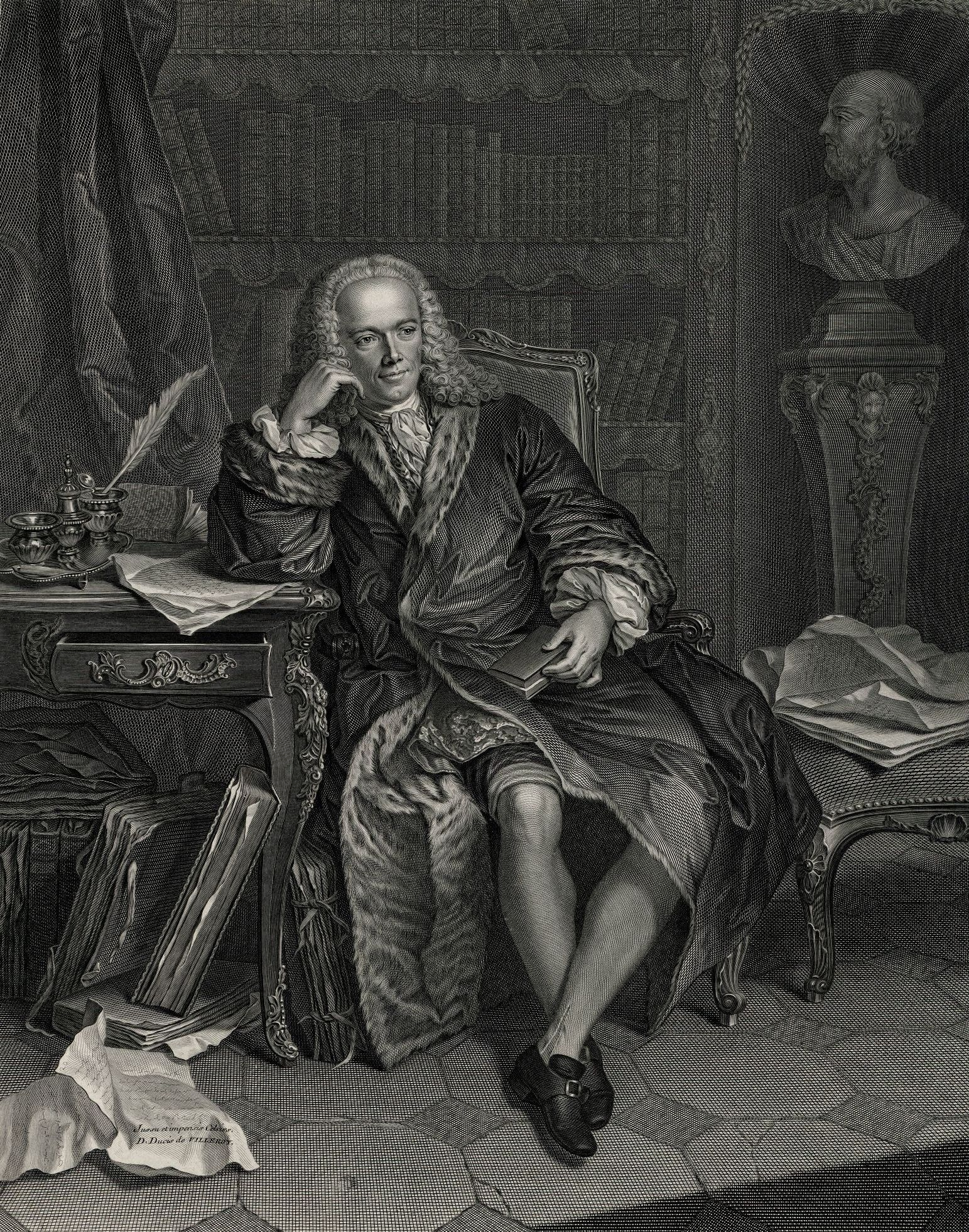
François Quesnay.

In fact, the understanding of wealth as a stock can be useful for investigations at the level of single individuals; but at the macroeconomic level, it is wealth as a flow that is the most relevant concept. Therefore, Pasinetti considers it as a great contribution – made already by the Physiocratic school of 18th century France – to have concentrated on the concepts of surplus and economic activity presented as a circular flow in the Tableau Economique, devised by François Quesnay. The Physiocratic ideas were developed by the Classical economists in Scotland and England and then by Marx. All of them saw the importance of production and wealth as a flow concept and further developed the Physiocratic ideas. The Marginalist revolution of the late 19th century preferred to go back to study the concept of wealth as a stock, thus largely de-emphasizing the problems of production and distribution, and to focus on models of "pure exchange".

From this point onwards, Pasinetti develops and presents, in a terse way, a truly Classical theory of production. This book became a book from which a whole generation of Italian students (and in some universities also non-Italian students) have learnt the theoretical scheme of Piero Sraffa, expressed in matrix notation (with a mathematical appendix devoted to the basic elements of matrix algebra) and the Input-Output analysis of Wassily Leontief.

In chapters 4, 5, and in an Appendix to Chapter 5, Pasinetti respectively deals with the Leontief model, with the Sraffa system, and Marx's transformation problem. He shows how, although the Leontief model and the Sraffa system were designed for different purposes, the former as an empirical tool and the latter as a theoretical framework, both have their basis in Physiocracy and Classical economics. The greatest theoretical achievement of the Sraffa system, Pasinetti says at the end of chapter 5, is that:

…in this construction is to be found in the demonstration that it is possible to treat the distribution of income independently of prices and in the demonstration, moreover, that this possibility is not tied to the pure labor theory of value. It is at last possible to state rigorously that the shortcomings and inadequacies of the Classical pure labor theory of value or, indeed, even the abandonment of such theory, leave quite unscathed the possibility of treating the distribution of income independently of prices.

— L. Pasinetti

The last two chapters are useful summaries of problems Pasinetti has dealt with extensively throughout his career. Chapter 6 explains some of the controversies on capital theory, the problem about reswitching and its implications for traditional economic analysis. In an appendix to chapter 6, Pasinetti also touches on linear programming. He points out that "unfortunately, linear programming was all too quickly constrained within the limits of traditional marginal analysis and lost its driving force".

Chapter 7 is an introduction to dynamic production models and their implications for the theory of distribution. Pasinetti exposits his own contributions to this field as a summary of the Von Neumann model, showing both its merits and limitations. For the sake of brevity Pasinetti does not present here his contributions to the field of structural change. But, this last chapter can be considered a proper introduction to his book Structural Change and Economic Growth, where all the problems of structural dynamics are widely discussed.

=== Structural Change and Economic Growth ===
In 1981 Structural Change and Economic Growth appeared. It was a book that had been in gestation since 1963, when Pasinetti presented his PhD thesis at Cambridge on "A Multi-Sector Model of Economic Growth". Five of the nine chapters of the thesis had earlier been published in a long article in 1965. Afterward, Pasinetti rewrote and added some chapters to reach the total of 11 chapters with which the book appeared.

This book is a theoretical investigation on the long-term evolution of industrial systems. According to Pasinetti, such work surged from:

A combination of three factors – one factual and two theoretical – originally prompted this investigation. The factual element was provided by the extremely uneven development – from sector to sector, from region to region – of the environment in which I lived (post-war Europe) at the time I began my training in economics. The two theoretical factors are represented by the two types of theories – specifically the macro-dynamics of economic growth and input-output analysis- […]

— L. Pasinetti

Leaving aside for a moment the technical aspects, we can say that overall the book is completely new for three reasons. To begin with, this was the first book to offer a unifying framework and a consistent alternative to that proposed by the Neoclassical theory. The latter strand of theory, which began in 1870, tried to explain the economic reality from a simpler view (exchange) under assumptions and analytical tools that were very restrictive, although its authors had the advantage that, "they have always clearly presented their arguments around a unifying problem (optimum allocation or scarce resources) and a unifying principle (the rational process of maximization under constraints)."

It was therefore natural that contributions made in isolation and apart from Neoclassical economics were either discarded or transformed, doctored to fit into the neoclassical model. Pasinetti's purpose is therefore to offer an alternative paradigm and unify these theories in a new and solid set, which incorporates the contributions of Keynes, Kalecki, Sraffa, Leontief, the macrodynamics models of Harrod and Domar and the distribution theory of the post-Keynesian economists in Cambridge: the whole lit and dotted with some of the theories, ideas and concerns of the classical economists.

The second important point is that it is the first work in which Pasinetti does not solve a specific problem in isolation, but tries to offer a global vision of the economic process and integrates all the contributions he had made before. In this book we can find his ideas about Classical economics, income distribution, capital theory and the theory of joint production, all of them sorted out and assembled in order to explain the dynamics of industrial societies.

The third point is of a methodological nature, and is probably the most important of all. Following the Classical economists, Pasinetti thinks that it is possible to frame the study of natural economic systems, i.e., economic systems free of institutions. In these natural systems it is possible to deduce a series of characteristics, principles and general laws, which are independent of the institutions that have to be introduced in later stages of investigation. These institutions are the ones that shape the features of real economic systems: for instance, a capitalist system or a socialist system. As he says, "is a distinctive feature of the present theoretical scheme to begin by carrying out the whole analysis at a level of investigation which the Classical economists called ‘natural’, that is to say, at a level of investigation which is so fundamental as to be independent of the institutional set-up of society".

Despite the high degree of abstraction of analysis, this method can provide answers to many real-world practical problems:

There is a further, very neat, methodological consequence that followed, namely a sharp discrimination between those economic problems that have to be solved on the ground of logic alone –for which economic theory is entirely autonomous- and those economic problems that arise in connection with particular institutions, or with particular groups’ or individuals’ behaviour – for which economic theory is no longer autonomous and needs to be integrated with further hypotheses […] Therefore, one will indeed have to go on, from the present analysis, to more detailed investigations concerning particular institutional set-ups, if more specific conclusions are to be drawn, but with no danger of confusing the two levels of enquiry.

— L. Pasinetti

The six first chapters of the book provide the analytical core of the work. In them, Pasinetti sets the conditions for an economy with neither unemployment nor idle production capacity. Pasinetti's analysis always runs from the simple to the more general models. Thus - after studying the equilibrium conditions in the short run in chapter 2 - in chapter 3 he analyzes the simplest of growth models: population grows at a steady percentage rate, while technical, and demand coefficients (i.e., consumer preferences) remain constant over time.

With these assumptions, two types of conditions are necessary to reach the full employment of resources. The first one is a macroeconomic condition: total expenditure must be equal to total income. The second is a set of sectoral conditions: each sector must have a rate of accumulation of capital sufficient to cover demand growth. Roughly, this is a series of ‘Harrod- Domar equations’: a specific Harrod- Domar equation must be satisfied in each particular sector.

The most important outcome of this analysis is that Pasinetti shows that, under such assumptions, it does not matter whether the analysis is carried out in macroeconomic terms or -in a more disaggregated way- in sectorial terms. As the system expands, while its proportions remain constant, the analysis does not lose any generality if carried out in aggregate terms. So, this is the case to which macroeconomic models of growth can be correctly applied. "If the whole structure of the economic system were really to remain constant through time, any disaggregated formulation would not provided us with particularly useful insights, besides those that are provided already by the corresponding, much simpler, macroeconomic formulations."

Chapters 4 and 5 are devoted to the elaboration of a really relevant general multi-sector dynamic model. While chapter 5 is devoted to the exposition of such a model, in chapter 4 Pasinetti displays one of the most important ideas of the whole book: not only does technical progress affect the production methods of the economy, it also generates changes in the composition of demand. The way in which Pasinetti introduces the dynamic behaviour of demand over time is an up-dated resumption of Engel's Law, which when generalized states that higher and higher levels of income lead to constantly changing consumption patterns.

This way of looking at the demand side allows Pasinetti to reach three notable findings. The first is that learning is an individual characteristic which is more basic and more realistic than the rational behaviour postulated by traditional economics. If income changes over time -and thus consumer preferences also change- consumers must continually be learning about new goods to consume. This implies that, "we can never expect each consumer to make the best possible consumption decisions".

The second finding is that because of changing consumer preferences over time, it is inevitable that (short term) sectorial imbalances will arise due to the changing structure of the demands for goods. Therefore, this will be a permanent source of disequilibrium in the system.

The third finding is that demand is going to play a major role in determining the structure of the main macroeconomic variables over time. Even through the formation of long-term prices, demand has a vital role to play in shaping the production quantities:

This other series of solutions say that the quantities to be produced depend on demand factors, namely on the per capita evolution in time of consumers’ preferences and on population. In other words, in the long run, demand determines the quantity of each commodity which has to be produced. This is the half of the problem which Ricardo did not see, and which Marshall then himself failed to bring out.

— L. Pasinetti

The second part of the book, from chapters 7 to 11, develops all the consequences derived from the dynamic model of chapters 4 and 5. The long term evolution of the major variables is explained in its composition: employment, wages, profits and capital/output and capital/labour ratios. Chapter 8 also provides a drastic distinction between the interest rate and the profit rate; and this closes the theoretical framework of the entire book and makes it particularly complete and compact.

The last chapter (11) takes the conclusions and the scheme of the model in chapter 5 and applies them to international economic relations. This chapter appears as slightly different from the rest of the book, because it is devoted to analyzing economic systems with international trade and economic relations in general. It is a chapter that deals with open economies that not only trade with other economies, but try to import knowledge and know-how. Pasinetti argues that the main benefits of international relations are in fact not so much those that derive from trade as those that derive from the international learning process between countries. Developing countries can strongly benefit from international relations if they succeed in imitating production methods from the developed countries. This is an encouraging possibility but has its limitations. Developing countries may not always be prepared to absorb all the technical methods of the developed countries because their lower levels of per capita income cause (according to Engel's law) the goods demanded in these countries to be different from those that are demanded in developed countries. The latter generally are not only much more sophisticated, but such as to require facilities that are not yet available in developing countries. In addition, Engel's law may require a strict order in consumption decisions.

The last paragraph of the book gives an excellent summary of the contents and the tone of Pasinetti's book:

It may be consoling to think that the wealth brought to us by the industrial age is a much more favourable type of wealth, that the old one, to relations among people and nations. For, if, in the pre-industrial world, the main way for a country to increase its wealth was to dominate and exploit its neighbours, today it has become to emulate them and do better. It is only a little less consoling to realise that, with all the new horizons open before us, we should so often let ourselves be prisoners of the old concepts and fall short of out actual possibilities, not because of objective difficulties, but because of the persistence of old ideas, which accomplish the rare combination of being both unfavourable and obsolete.

— L. Pasinetti

In 1993, Pasinetti returned to the problems of structural dynamics with a book (Structural economic dynamics – a theory of the economic consequences of human learning). This book explores the inter-relations between the structural change of production, of prices, and of employment as a necessary consequence of human learning, by carrying out the analysis in terms of a "pure labour model", i.e., a model in which labour, to be intended as human activity in general, is the only factor of production. This book has (incorrectly) been interpreted as an extreme simplification of the process of structural dynamics.

=== Vertically integrated sectors and their importance for the dynamic analysis ===
The deep study developed by Pasinetti in Structural Change and Economic Growth on the dynamics of growth of industrial systems led to the development of an entirely new analytical tool: the concept of vertically integrated sectors. In fact, in the 1965 paper, from which Structural Change was later developed, the notion of vertically integrated sector was already present, though more as a simplifying assumption than as a really important analytical concept. The publication of Sraffa's book Production of commodities by means of commodities in 1960 motivated Pasinetti to reflect on the importance of such a concept. As pointed out by Pasinetti:

Piero Sraffa

Sraffa's book brought theoretical attention back to the process of production considered as a circular process. This is precisely what, on purpose, I had completely eliminated from my analysis, by adopting not only a vertically integrated conception of the production process but also sharp simplifications as to the employment of labour and capital goods in each single sector. My approach had the great advantage of leading to dynamic analysis straightaway, without that fixity of coefficients which had constrained all inter-industry analysis into a static strait-jacket.

— L. Pasinetti

In 1973 Pasinetti published a paper, "The Notion of Vertical Integration in Economic Analysis", which would be a milestone for the development of all the analytical implications of the concept and its relation to the inter-industry theoretical schemes of Input-Output type.

The concept of vertically integrated sector is implicitly contained in the work of many economists. Most macroeconomic models, in order to avoid the analysis of intermediate goods, use that notion. The question then is why the use of the concept of a vertically integrated sector is much more advantageous for the dynamic analysis that, for instance, the classic Input-Output models.

A vertically integrated sector is, above all, a purely theoretical construction. Each of these sectors is constructed behind each of the final goods production processes, so that these can be decomposed into two clearly distinguishable elements: an amount of labour and a quantity of capital goods. "In a vertically integrated model, the criterion is the process of production of a final commodity, and the problem is to build conceptually behind each final commodity a vertically integrated sector which, by passing through all the intermediate commodities, goes right back to the original inputs".

The great advantage of this abstract construction is that, besides being much more relevant to the dynamic analysis, it can be easily converted by algebraic operations into an Input-Output scheme. The coefficients of production of a vertically integrated model are basically a linear combination of the coefficients of production of an Input-Output model. This means that it is possible to obtain empirical values of the vertically integrated coefficients for an economy. We need only to obtain the values of the production coefficients on each industry (as it is commonly done by the different national account agencies) as well as the capital data at current prices; then we take the transposed inverse matrix of the estimated coefficients and we multiplied it by the vector of capital stocks. This allows us to obtain the vector of vertically integrated capital stock of an industry, a vector that can be seen as a kind of composite good involved in the production of the final commodity considered, which Pasinetti calls unit of vertically integrated productive capacity. A similar procedure is applied with respect to the coefficients of labour. Thus, each final good is summarized in a vertically integrated labour coefficient and a unit of vertically integrated productive capacity.

The importance of this algebraic manipulation is notable because it allows linking a measurable and observable magnitudes (corresponding to the Input-Output analysis) with more compact magnitudes which have a deeper economic significance for the dynamic analysis. Thus, both methods (Input-Output and vertical integration) are essentially different points of view to perceive the same thing.

Nonetheless, this relationship between the contribution of Pasinetti and Input-Output models, valid for a static analysis, vanishes in a dynamic analysis. The matrix of technical coefficients, i.e., the link between the two methods of analysis, evolves over time due to technical change and change of production methods in the economy. That is, we would require an Input-Output table at each point in time for the dynamic analysis of an economy. However, the movement of vertically integrated coefficients can be analyzed over time, as these relationships include the expressions of technical change. This is the reason why the analysis in terms of vertically integrated coefficients is most appropriate for dynamic analysis. We can go back, however, to an inter-sectoral analysis (Input-Output) with reference to any given point in time when we are interested in it.

As Pasinetti says:

In this context, the vertically integrated technical coefficients acquire a meaning of their own, independent of the origin of the single parts which compose them. The movements of these coefficients through time, and he various consequences thereof, can be investigated and followed as such. When more information is needed about the industrial structure at a particular point of time, the vertically integrated coefficients can be split and analysed into inter-industry coefficients particular to that point in time.

— L. Pasinetti

The result that the vertically integrated technical coefficients can be set up independently of the vagaries of technical change is a result of such importance that it could lead us to reconsider much of the work on structural economic dynamics:

It may not be too much to hope that a better understanding, and a more explicit utilisation, of the logical process of vertical integration will help to overcome the widely recognised failure of modern economic theory to come to grips with the analytical difficulties of technical change.

— L. Pasinetti

=== Keynes and the Cambridge Keynesians ===
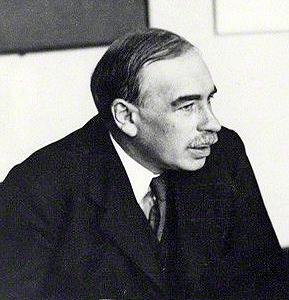
John Maynard Keynes.

Keynes and the Cambridge Keynesians (2007) is the latest book published by Pasinetti. Therein, Pasinetti proposes to consider Keynesian economics as an alternative paradigm to Neoclassical economics, emphasizing the contributions of the Cambridge Keynesians as well as future development lines on these issues.

Probably, Pasinetti -recognized as the heir of the Cambridge economists-, is the most suitable economist to talk about that ambience, because, as he himself acknowledges:

I happened to become, at a certain point, part and witness of this School. The inevitable emotional involvement of a participant may well have influenced my judgements, for better or worse. But I hope this will be counter-balanced by those insights that only insiders have the privilege to perceive.

— L. Pasinetti

The gestation period of the book, as is usual for Pasinetti's books, was long: about 15 years. In fact, with the notable exception of part three, the book is a collection of writings that Pasinetti had prepared years ago. Part three, on the other hand, is new and presumably the most important part of the book. That is, Keynes and the Cambridge Keynesians is composed of three parts or, more properly, of three Books.

Book I is a summary of what has been known as the "Keynesian Revolution". It is taken from set of lectures delivered by Pasinetti in memory of the Italian economist Federico Caffé, in October 1994 at La Sapienza University, Rome. In this Book, Pasinetti makes a chronological overview of the outbreak of the "Keynesian Revolution", from the first attempts of Keynes in the early 1930s, to the evolution of Keynesian thinking and the subsequent misinterpretation of his theory by the economists of the "Neoclassical synthesis". Book I also contains some reflections on the progress of knowledge in economics and the rise and fall of scientific paradigms based on the work of the famous epistemologist Thomas Kuhn. The conclusions of Book I also advocate the revival of Keynesian economics with a touch of hope for future generations of economists:

Perhaps, in spite of all, as a final consequence of the mounting difficulties in the attempts at reconciliations, it may well be the task of a new generation of economists to produce that break with orthodox economics that was started, genuinely attempted, strongly pursued, but not accomplished by Keynes and the Keynesian group. Many dramatic changes took place in the last two decades of the twentieth century on the economic and political scene. New minds –liberated from the prejudices that have been obfuscating our visions- may well have become better equipped to bring about that genuine Keynesian revolution which has so far remained unaccomplished.

— L. Pasinetti

Book II, entitled The Cambridge School of Keynesian Economics is by far the longest part of the book. It is composed of, in this order, by the biographies of Richard Kahn, Joan Robinson, Nicholas Kaldor, Piero Sraffa and Richard Goodwin. All of them had already appeared in various places several years earlier, although for this book Pasinetti re-arranged them. The chapter on Kaldor, for example, is a synthesis of two articles written on different occasions. In terms of space, Sraffa is the economist treated in greatest detail by Pasinetti, dedicating to him three, quite independent biographical essays.

Besides the importance of each one of the biographies, the purpose of all of them is:

The foregoing biographical sketches on Kahn, Joan Robinson, Kaldor and Sraffa may help –I hope- to highlight the multifaceted and significant aspects of the Cambridge School of Keynesian Economics. I hope the reader may have been able to grasp the unity, in some basic sense, of their purposes and at the same time the intriguing disparities in their approaches in many other respects [...] I shall therefore argue that the relevant message that should be extracted from the works of the Cambridge School of Keynesian Economics is, in fact, positive –not negative.

— L. Pasinetti

Book II ends with some suggestions, nine in total, which according to Pasinetti are at the heart of the "Keynesian Revolution". The issues involved are:

1. Reality (and not simply abstract rationality) as the starting point of economic theory.
2. Economic logic with internal consistency (and not only formal rigour).
3. Malthus and the Classics (not Walras and the Marginalists) as the major inspiring source in the history of economic thought.
4. Non-ergodic (in place of stationary, timeless) economic systems.
5. Causality versus interdependence.
6. Macroeconomics before microeconomics.
7. Disequilibrium and instability (not equilibrium) as the normal state of the industrial economies.
8. Necessity of finding an appropriate analytical framework for dealing with technical change and economic growth.
9. A strong, deeply felt social concern.

Finally, Book III is a conclusion, not only of the previous chapters of this volume, but also of the whole conception of how Pasinetti would like economic analysis to be carried out. He asserts the need to rise above and go beyond Neoclassical economics through a genuine resurgence of a Classical-Keynesian paradigm, which can be rescued and strengthened and developed by the methodology that Pasinetti has pursued during the whole of his life, made explicit for the first time in his Structural Change and Economic Growth. Basically, he argues for the possibility of formulating, at a first level of investigation, a pure economic theory, independently from the institutional framework of society, and then, at a second level of investigation, of developing an analysis of the relevant institutions, thus achieving a theoretical framework that may allow us to understand the basic features of the monetary production economies in which we live today.

== Bibliography ==
=== Works of Luigi Pasinetti ===
- Pasinetti, L. [1960], "A Mathematical Formulation of the Ricardian System", in The Review of Economic Studies, 1959–60, vol.27, pp. 78–98.
- Pasinetti, L. [1962], ‘Rate of profit and Income Distribution in Relation to the Rate of Economic Growth’, Review of Economic Studies, XXIX (4), October, 267-279.
- Pasinetti, L. [1965], "Causalità e interdipendenza nell'analisi econometrica e nella teoria economica", in: Annuario dell'Università Cattolica del S. Cuore, 1964–65, Milan: Vita e Pensiero, pp. 233–250.
- Pasinetti, L. [1965], "A New Theoretical Approach to the Problems of Economic Growth", in: Pontificiæ Academiæ Scientiarum Scripta Varia, n.28; Proceedings of a Study Week on "The Econometric Approach to Development Planning", Vatican City, 1963. Reprinted by: North Holland Publ. Co, 1965: Amsterdam, pp. 572–696.
- Pasinetti, L. [1966], "New Results in an Old Framework: Comment on Samuelson and Modigliani", in The Review of Economic Studies, vol.33, n.4, pp. 303–306.
- Pasinetti, L. [1966], "Changes in the Rate of Profit and Switches of Techniques" (leading article of "Paradoxes in Capital Theory: A Symposium"), in The Quarterly Journal of Economics, vol.80, pp. 503–517.
- Pasinetti, L. [1969], "Switches of Techniques and the "Rate of Return" in Capital Theory", in The Economic Journal, vol.79, pp. 508–531.
- Pasinetti, L. [1973], "The Notion of Vertical Integration in Economic Analysis", in: Metroeconomica, vol.25, pp. 1–29. Reprinted in: L. Pasinetti (ed.), Essays on the Theory of Joint Production, London: Macmillan; and New York: Columbia University Press, 1980, pp. 16–43.
- Pasinetti, L. [1974], Growth and Income Distribution - Essays in Economic Theory, Cambridge: Cambridge University Press. Translations: Italian: Sviluppo Economico e Distribuzione del Reddito, Bologna: Il Mulino, 1977; Spanish: Crecimiento económico y distribución de la renta - Ensayos de teoría económica, Madrid: Alianza Editorial, 1978; Portuguese: Rio de Janeiro, 1979; Japanese: Tokyo, 1985.
- Pasinetti, L. [1977],"On 'Non-substitution' in Production Models", in Cambridge Journal of Economics, vol.1, pp. 389–394.
- Pasinetti, L. [1977], Lectures on the theory of production, MacMillan. Italian version: Contributi alla teoria della produzione congiunta, Il Mulino Bologna, 1974, Translations: Spanish: Aportaciones a la teoría de la producción conjunta, México City, Mexico: Fondo de Cultura Económica/Serie de Economía, 1986; Japanese: Tokyo, 1989.
- Pasinetti, L. [1980], Essays on the Theory of Joint Production, London: Macmillan, and New York: Columbia University Press.
- Pasinetti, L. [1981], "On the Ricardian Theory of Value: A Note", in: The Review of Economic Studies, vol.48, pp. 673–675.
- Pasinetti, L. [1981], Structural Change and Economic Growth: a Theoretical essay on the dynamics of the wealth of nations, Cambridge University Press. Italian version: Dinamica strutturale e sviluppo economico - Un'indagine teorica sui mutamenti nella ricchezza delle nazioni, Turin: U.T.E.T., 1984. Translations: Spanish: Cambio estructural y crecimiento económico, Madrid: Ediciones Pirámide, S.A., 1985; Japanese: Tokyo, 1983.
- Pasinetti, L. [1986], "Theory of Value - A Source of Alternative Paradigms in Economic Analysis", in: Mauro Baranzini and Roberto Scazzieri eds., Foundations of Economics - Structures of Inquiry and Economic Theory, Oxford: Basil Blackwell, pp. 409–431
- Pasinetti, L. [1988], "Growing Sub-systems, Vertically Hyper-integrated Sectors and the Labour Theory of Value", in Cambridge Journal of Economics, vol.12, pp. 125–134.
- Pasinetti, L. [1988], "Technical Progress and International Trade", in Empirica, vol.15, pp. 139–147.
- Pasinetti, L. [1989], "Ricardian Debt/Taxation Equivalence in the Kaldor Theory of Profits and Income Distribution", Cambridge Journal of Economics, vol.13, pp. 25–36.
- Pasinetti, L. [1993], Structural Economic Dynamics - A theory of the economic consequences of human learning, Cambridge: Cambridge University Press. Italian version: Dinamica economica strutturale. - Un'indagine teorica sulle conseguenze economiche dell'apprendimento umano, Bologna: Il Mulino, 1993; Japanese translation: Tokyo, 1998.
- Pasinetti, L. [1998], "The myth (or folly) of the 3% deficit-GDP Maastricht ‘parameter’", in Cambridge Journal of Economics, vol.22, pp. 103-116.
- Pasinetti, L. [2003], Letter to the Editor, in: "Comments – Cambridge Capital Controversies", in Journal of Economic Perspectives, Fall 2003, vol. 17, n. 4, pp. 227–8. (A comment on Avi J. Cohen and Geoffrey Harcourt's "Cambridge Capital Theory Controversies" in Journal of Economic Perspectives, Winter 2003, vol. 17, n. 1, pp. 199–214).
- Pasinetti, L. [2007], Keynes and the Cambridge Keynesians: A ‘Revolution in Economics’ to be Accomplished, Cambridge University Press. Italian version: Keynes e i Keynesiani di Cambridge. Una ‘rivoluzione in economia’ da portare a compimento, Laterza, 2010.

=== Other sources ===
- Arestis, P. and Sawyer, M. (eds.) [2000], A Biographical Dictionary of Dissenting Economists, Edward Elgar, second edition.
- Baranzini Mauro and Harcourt Geoffrey C. [1993], The Dynamics of the Wealth of Nations, Macmillan, London.
- Blaug, M. [1985], Great Economists since Keynes, Wheatseaf Books.
- Blaug, M. (1999), Who's who in economics, Edward Elgar, third edition.
- Cohen A. and Harcourt G. [2003], "Whatever Happened to the Cambridge Capital Theory controversies?", The Journal of Economic Perspectives, vol.17, no.1, pp. 199–214.
- Fleck, F. H. and Domenghino, C. M. [1987], "Cambridge (UK) versus Cambridge (Mass.): a Keynesian solution of the ‘Pasinetti Paradox’, Journal of Post-Keynesian Economics, vol. X, pp. 22–36.
- Kaldor, N. [1956], Alternative Theories of Distribution, Review of Economic Studies, vol. 23, pp. 83–100.
- Kaldor, N. [1966], "Marginal Productivity and the Macroeconomic Theories of Distribution: Comment on Samuelson and Modigliani", Review of Economic Studies, XXXIII, October, pp. 309–19.
- Harcourt, G. and Laing N. (eds.) [1971], Capital and Growth, Penguin Modern Economics Readings.
- Harcourt, N [1975], Some Cambridge Controversies in the Theory of Capital, Cambridge University Press.
- Leijonhuvfud, A. [2007], Between Keynes and Sraffa: Pasinetti on the Cambridge School.
- Meade, J. E. [1966], "The Outcome of the Pasinetti-process": A Note", Economic Journal, vol.76, 1966, pp. 161–165.
- Panico, C. and Salvadori, N. (eds.) [1993], Post Keynesian Theory of Growth and Distribution, Edward Elgar.
- Robinson, J. [1953-1954], "The Production Function and the Theory of Capital", Review of Economic Studies, vol.21, pp. 81–106.
- Samuelson, P. A. and Modigliani, F. [1966], "The Pasinetti Paradox in Neoclassical and More General Models", The Review of Economic Studies, pp. 269–301.
- Scazzieri, R. [1983], "Economic dynamics and Structural Change: A Comment on Pasinetti", Rivista Internazionale di Scienze Economiche e Commerciali, 30, pp. 597–611.
- Steedman, I. [1972], "The State and the Outcome of the Pasinetti Process, Economic Journal, 82, December, pp. 1387-95.
- Teixeira, J.R., [1998], ‘Luigi L. Pasinetti’ in: Ferdinando Meacci (ed.), Italian Economists of the 20th Century, Edward Elgar, Cheltenham, UK, pp. 272–294.

== See also ==
- Ricardian economics
