= Technical change =

Term used in economics

A technical change is a term used in economics to describe a change in the amount of output produced from the same amount of inputs. A technical change is not necessarily technological as it might be organizational, or due to a change in a constraint such as regulation, input prices, or quantities of inputs. Some scholars note the paradox that technical change is considered to be the most important source of economic dynamism, the rate of change in capitalist economies, but it is ignored in mainstream media.

It is possible to measure technical change as the change in output per unit of factor input.

In free-market economies, technological advances lead to increases in productivity, but at the expense of older, less-efficient means of production, creating a level of subjective risk for which the compensation (in theory) is the return on capital. This rate or return is a reflection of all of the perceived risks associated with the capital financing of the means of production, including technology risks. From a capital finance point of view, advances in technology are the classic definition of systemic market risk. The outflow of this condition is the "creative destruction" of a portion of the means of production as evidenced by businesses discontinuing the production of obsolete products and/or the cessation of business activities that are no longer profitable. In its purest form, capitalism entails a constant level of creative destruction of a portion of the means of production and the increase in Gross Domestic Product (GDP) of the subject economy reflects the growth after the losses due to economic obsolescence have been reconciled. Accordingly, increases in GDP provides a substantive measurement that demonstrates that capitalism does not in effect create an economic construct where one party can only make a gain at the expense of the other party (i.e.: if one party could only profit at the expense of another party, then it would be impossible to achieve any nominal growth in GDP).

The "natural process" of capitalism (including creative destruction) is the subject of great contention by adherents of other systems of macroeconomic organization who see the end-result of obsolescence as the creation of a permanent underclass that has an unequal level of access to capital investment, educational resources that are not necessarily of their own making, while others seek to create an equal outcome for disproportionate labor or capital inputs that have not as yet been able to demonstrate a viable model that can compete against free-market economies on a near-term or long-term basis.
