= Richard Kahn, Baron Kahn =

British economist

The Right Honourable The Lord Kahn
- Born: Richard Ferdinand Kahn; 10 August 1905; Hampstead, England, UK
- Died: 6 June 1989 (aged 83); Cambridge, England, UK
- Parent(s): Augustus Kahn (father); Regina Schoyer (mother)

Academic background
- Influences: Gerald Shove, John Maynard Keynes

Academic work
- Discipline: Political economy
- School or tradition: Keynesian economics
- Doctoral students: Luigi Pasinetti
- Notable students: Richard Stone
- Notable ideas: Economic multiplier

Richard Ferdinand Kahn, Baron Kahn, CBE, FBA (10 August 1905 – 6 June 1989) was a British economist.

== Life and career ==
Kahn was born in Hampstead into the orthodox Jewish family of Augustus Kahn, inspector of schools and former German schoolmaster, and Regina Schoyer. He was brought up in England and educated at St Paul's School, London. He attended King's College, Cambridge. Kahn took a 1st in Mathematics, Part I, at Cambridge, followed in 1927 by a 2nd in Physics in the Natural Sciences tripos. Taught economics by Gerald Shove and John Maynard Keynes from 1927 to 1928, he gained a 1st in Economics, Part II, in 1928. In 1930, he was elected a Fellow of King's College.

Kahn worked in the Faculty of Economics and Politics from 1933. He became Director of Studies for economics students at King's College in 1947, a post he held for four years. Kahn was appointed professor of economics in 1951, and succeeded Keynes as Bursar of King's College. He served in numerous other government and agency positions, such as the research and planning division of the United Nations Economic Commission for Europe in 1955 and the UK National Coal Board in 1967. Kahn retired from Cambridge in 1972, but continued to live at King's College.

== Economic theory ==
Kahn was one of the five members of Keynes' Cambridge Circus. He was also one of Keynes' closest collaborators on the creation of Keynes' General Theory of Employment, Interest and Money. His most notable contribution to Keynesian economics was his principle of the multiplier. The multiplier is the relation between the increase in aggregate expenditure and the increase in net national product (output). It is the increase in aggregate expenditure (for example government spending) that causes the increase in output (or income). His findings on the multiplier were first published in his 1931 article, "The Relation of Home Investment to Unemployment". There has been extensive debate on whether Kahn's thinking on the multiplier was foreshadowed or aided by the work of other economists such as Lyndhurst Giblin.

== Public life and politics ==
Kahn was made a Commander of the Order of the British Empire (CBE) in 1946 and became a Fellow of the British Academy in 1960, and was created a life peer with the title Baron Kahn, of Hampstead in the London Borough of Camden on 6 July 1965. He was sympathetic to the Gaitskellite wing of the Labour Party, and in the 1950s was part of an expert group that advised Gaitskell on economic policy. Like Gaitskell (but unlike most Gaitskellites), he opposed Britain's attempts to join the European Economic Community (EEC), and in 1971 was one of 100 economists who signed a letter to The Times claiming that the economic effects of EEC membership would be unfavourable to Britain. Despite his anti-EEC credentials, Kahn nevertheless joined the staunchly European Social Democratic Party (SDP) upon its foundation in 1981, and sat on that party's benches in the House of Lords.

== Selected works ==
- Wicksell, Knut (1936). Interest and Prices (Geldzins und Gütepreise) A Study of the Causes Regulating the Value of Moneey. Translated by Kahn, Richard. London: Macmillan and Co., Limited for the Royal Economic Society – via Internet Archive.
