= Christopher Bliss =

British economist

Christopher John Emile Bliss, FBA (born 1940) is a British economist who was the Nuffield Professor of International Economics at the University of Oxford between 1992 and 2007.

Born in 1940, Bliss was educated at King's College, Cambridge, graduating in 1962 and then completing a PhD there in 1966. He was elected to a fellowship at Christ's College, Cambridge in 1965, the same year he was appointed to an assistant lectureship at the University of Cambridge. Promoted to a full lectureship in 1967, he moved to the University of Essex in 1971 to be Professor of Economics, before moving again in 1977, this time to the University of Oxford where he was appointed Nuffield Reader in International Economics and elected to a fellowship at Nuffield College. In 1992, he was appointed Nuffield Professor of International Economics, retiring in 2007. He was elected fellow of the Econometric Society in 1975 and Fellow of the British Academy in 1988 and sat on the Academy's council from 2006 to 2007.

== Bibliography ==
- Capital Theory and the Distribution of Income (North-Holland Publishing Company, 1975).
- (with Nicholas Stern) Palanpur: the Economy of an Indian Village (Oxford University Press, 1982).
- (edited with Jorge Braga De Macedo) Unity with Diversity in the European Economy: The Community's Southern Frontier (Cambridge University Press, 1990).
- Economic Theory and Policy for Trading Blocks (Manchester University Press, 1994).
- (edited with Avi J.Cohen, and G. C. Harcourt) Capital: An Elgar Reference Collection (Edward Elgar Publishing, 2005).
- Trade, Growth, and Inequality (Oxford University Press, 2007).
