= Cambridge Journal of Economics =

- Discipline: Economics
- Language: English
- Edited by: Jacqui Lagrue

Publication details
- History: 1977–present
- Publisher: Oxford University Press (United Kingdom)
- Frequency: Bimonthly
- Impact factor: 2.156 (2020)

Standard abbreviations
- ISO 4: Camb. J. Econ.

Indexing
- ISSN: 0309-166X (print); 1464-3545 (web)
- LCCN: 80647135
- JSTOR: 0309166X
- OCLC no.: 3020038

Links
- Journal homepage; Online access; Online archive

The Cambridge Journal of Economics is a peer-reviewed academic journal of economics. The journal was founded in 1977 by the Cambridge Political Economy Society with the aim of publishing articles that followed the economic traditions established by Karl Marx, J. M. Keynes, Michał Kalecki, Joan Robinson, and Nicholas Kaldor. Luigi Pasinetti has noted the "strong ties" between the Cambridge Journal of Economics and the Cambridge School of Keynesian Economics.

== Abstracting and indexing ==
The journal is abstracted and indexed in the Social Sciences Citation Index. According to the Journal Citation Reports, the journal has a 2022 impact factor of 2.0.

== See also ==
- List of economics journals
