= Fernando Vianello =

Italian economist and academic (1939–2009)

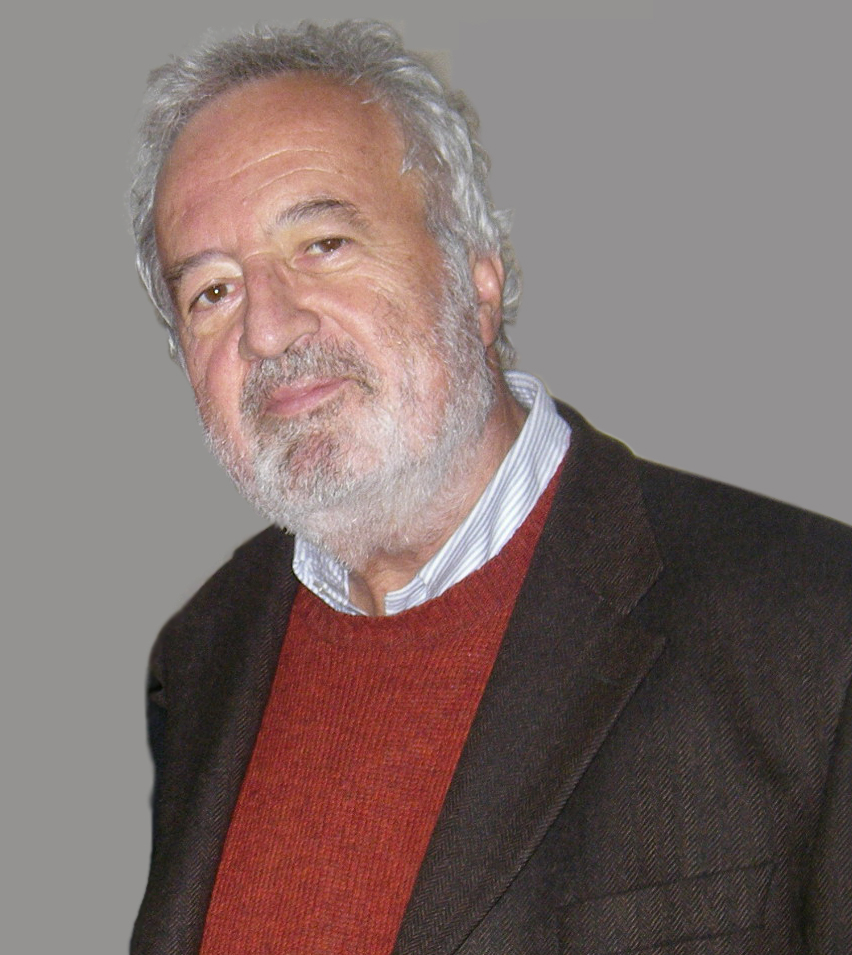
- Born: 17 August 1939; Bologna; Italy
- Died: 10 August 2009 (aged 69); Rome, Italy

Academic background
- Education: University of Bologna; Jesus College, Cambridge
- Influences: Adam Smith; David Ricardo; John Maynard Keynes; Piero Sraffa; Paolo Sylos Labini; Pierangelo Garegnani

Academic work
- Discipline: Political economy
- School or tradition: Neo-Ricardian school

Fernando Vianello (17 August 1939 – 10 August 2009) was an Italian economist and academic. Together with Michele Salvati, Sebastiano Brusco, Andrea Ginzburg and Salvatore Biasco, he founded the Faculty of Economics of the University of Modena and Reggio Emilia.

== Education ==
In 1963 Vianello graduated with a degree in law from the University of Bologna, presenting a thesis on Italian economic development under the supervision of Paolo Sylos Labini. In the same year he attended the sixth training course on "Economic Development" organized in Rome by SVIMEZ (Italian Association of Southern Italy's Industries Development), managed by Claudio Napoleoni. From 1964 to 1966 he was an assistant professor in the "Principles of Political Economy" course held by Sylos Labini at the Faculty of Statistics of the "Sapienza" University of Rome.

In 1966 Vianello enrolled as an undergraduate student at Jesus College, Cambridge, and began attending economic courses taught by Joan Robinson, Nicholas Kaldor, Richard Kahn and James Meade. In 1968 he obtained a BA degree in economics (Bachelor of Arts Degree) from the University of Cambridge.

== Academic career ==
During his career Vianello had the opportunity to collaborate with some of the most important Italian economists of the twentieth century, such as Federico Caffè, Paolo Sylos Labini and Pierangelo Garegnani. He held a number of posts at several different universities:

=== University of Siena ===
Faculty of Economic and Banking Sciences

- Associate Professor of History of Economic Doctrines.

=== University of Modena and Reggio Emilia ===
Faculty of Economics

- Associate (later full) Professor of History of Economic Doctrines (1969–1987).

=== "Sapienza" University of Rome ===
Faculty of Economics

- Director of Public Economics Department (1988–1989).
- Full Professor of Economics and History of Economic Analysis (1987–2009).
- Head of the PhD course in Economics (1999–2001).
- Professor of Macroeconomics in PhD course in Economics (1987–2009).

== Research ==
Over the course of his long career Vianello developed his expertise in several different research fields. He worked with the theories of value and distribution of income and paid special attention to the link between capital accumulation and the profit rate. He analyzed classical political economy theories from Adam Smith, David Ricardo and Karl Marx.

He then tackled important events concerning the Italian economy and the European Union. Regarding the Italian economy, he first studied the aftermath of the Second World War, then the answer to the workers' struggles of the sixties and early seventies, and most recently Italy's adhesion to the European single currency. With regard to the European economy, he focused his attention to the reasons, operating ways and the consequences of the European Monetary System and the European single currency.

Finally, he studied the issues of prices, interest rate and effective demand, and developed ideas that were stimulated by the writings of John Maynard Keynes.

== Personal life ==
Vianello had a wife, Mariella Vianello née Gramaglia, a journalist who was a member of the Italian Parliament during the Legislature X of Italy. Mrs. Vianello was also an assessor, appointed at the Comune of Rome firstly by mayor Francesco Rutelli and then by mayor Walter Veltroni. They had two children, Maddalena and Michele.

== List of publications ==
A selection of published works written by Vianello is available online at the website of the Faculty of Economics of the University of Modena and Reggio Emilia.

=== In English language ===
- Vianello, F. [1983], "On Ricardo's principle that the profits of the farmer regulate the profits of all other trades" in: Studi e ricerche dell'Istituto economico, 18, Università degli studi di Modena, Modena, Stem Mucchi.
- Vianello, F. [1985], "The Pace of Accumulation", in: Political Economy. Studies in the Surplus Approach, 1, pp. 69–87.
- Vianello, F. [1987], "Labour theory of value", in: Eatwell, J. and Milgate, M. and Newman, P. (eds.): The New Palgrave: A Dictionary of Economics, Macmillan e Stockton, London e New York, ISBN 978-0-935859-10-2.
- Vianello, F. [1988], "A critique of Professor Goodwin's Critique of Sraffa", in: Ricci, G. and Velupillai, K. (eds.), Growth, Cycles and Multisectoral Economics: the Goodwin Tradition, Berlin, Springer-Verlag, ISBN 978-3-540-19467-5.
- Vianello, F. [1989], "Effective Demand and the Rate of Profits: Some Thoughts on Marx, Kalecki and Sraffa", in: Sebastiani, M. (ed.), Kalecki's Relevance Today, London, Macmillan, ISBN 978-0-312-02411-6.
- Vianello, F. [1989], "Natural (or Normal) Prices. Some Pointers", in: Political Economy. Studies in the Surplus Approach, 2, pp. 89–105.
- Vianello, F. [1996], "Joan Robinson on Normal Prices (and the Normal rate of Profits)", in: Marcuzzo, M.C. and Pasinetti, L.L. and Roncaglia, A. (eds.), The Economics of Joan Robinson, New York, Routledge, ISBN 978-0-415-13616-7.
- Simonazzi, A. and Vianello, F. [1998], "Italy towards European Monetary Union (and domestic socio-economic disunion)", in: B.H. Moss, J. Michie (eds.), The Single European Currency in National Perspective. A community in Crisis?, Macmillan, London, ISBN 978-0-333-79293-3.
- Vianello, F. [1999], "Social accounting in Adam Smith", in: Mongiovi, G. and Petri F. (eds.), Value, Distribution and capital. Essays in honor of Pierangelo Garegnani, London, Routledge, ISBN 0-415-14277-6.
- Simonazzi, A. and Vianello, F. [2001], "Financial Liberalization, the European Single Currency and the Problem of Unemployment", in: Franzini, R. and Pizzuti, R.F. (eds.), Globalization, Institutions and Social Cohesion, Springer Verlag, Heidelberg, ISBN 3-540-67741-0.
- Vianello, F. [2004], "Reviewing a Review", in: Foley D.K. and Garegnani, P. and Pivetti, M. and Vianello, F., Classical Theory and Policy Analysis: A Round Table, Centro di ricerche e documentazione "Piero Sraffa", Materiali di Discussione n. 1, Roma, Aracne. Published in: Review of Political Economy, vol. 19, no. 2, 2007.
- Simonazzi, A. and Vianello, F. [2007], "Price and Prejudice. The statics and dynamics of money-wage flexibility", in: Marcuzzo, M.C. and Giacomin, A. (eds.), Money and markets, London, Routledge, pp. 115–132, ISBN 978-0-415-38403-2.

=== In Italian language ===
- Vianello, F. [1969], "Nota del curatore a Francesco Saverio Nitti. Saggi di Economia e Finanza", vol. V, in: Vianello, F. (ed.), (Preface by Sylos Labini, P.), Saggi economici vari. Disegni di legge. Discorsi, Laterza, Bari, pp. 609–634.
- Vianello, F. [1970], Valore prezzi e distribuzione del reddito, Roma, Edizioni dell'Ateneo.
- Vianello, F. [1971], Quantità di lavoro e rapporti di scambio, Roma, Edizioni dell'Ateneo.
- Vianello, F. [1973], "Plusvalore e profitto nell'analisi di Marx", in: Sylos Labini, P. (ed.), Prezzi relativi e distribuzione del reddito, Torino, Boringhieri, ISBN 978-88-339-5368-7.
- Vianello, F. [1973], "La classe operaia e l'aumento dei prezzi", in: VV.AA., Contro l'inflazione, Coines Edizioni, Roma.
- Ginzburg, A. and Vianello, F. [1973], "Il fascino discreto della teoria economica", in: Rinascita, 31, 3 agosto, republished in: VV.AA. [1974], Marxismo ed economia. Un dibattito di «Rinascita», Venezia, Marsilio.
- Vianello, F. [1975], "La DC e lo sviluppo capitalistico in Italia dal dopoguerra ad oggi", in: VV.AA., Tutto il potere della DC, Coines Edizioni, Roma.
- Vianello, F. [1975], "I meccanismi di recupero del profitto", in: Graziani, A. (ed.), Crisi e ristrutturazione dell'economia italiana, Torino, Einaudi. Republished in: Vianello, F. [1979], Il profitto e il potere. Una raccolta di saggi (1974–1979), Torino, Rosenberg & Sellier.
- Vianello, F. [1976], Introduzione a D. Ricardo, Sui principi dell'economia politica e delle tassazione, Milano, Isedi.
- Vianello, F. [1977], "Occupazione e bilancia dei pagamenti", in: VV.AA., Crisi, occupazione, riconversione, Torino, Rosenberg & Sellier, republished in: Vianello, F. [1979], Il profitto e il potere. Una raccolta di saggi (1974–1979), Torino, Rosenberg & Sellier.
- Bonifati, G. and Vianello, F. [1978], "L'economia italiana al tempo del Piano del lavoro", in: Il Piano del lavoro della CGIL, 1949–1950, Milano, Feltrinelli.
- Vianello, F. [1979], "Osservazioni sul capitale fisso e sulle quantità negative di lavoro", in: Studi e ricerche dell'Istituto economico, 4, Università degli studi di Modena, Modena, Stem Mucchi.
- Vianello, F. [1979], Il profitto e il potere. Una raccolta di saggi (1974–1979), Torino, Rosenberg & Sellier, ISBN 978-88-7011-092-0.
- Vianello, F. [1979], "Lo sviluppo capitalistico italiano dal dopoguerra al «miracolo economico»: una veduta di insieme", in: Vianello, F. [1979], Il profitto e il potere. Una raccolta di saggi (1974–1979), Torino, Rosenberg & Sellier.
- Vianello, F. [1979], "L'Europa fra dollaro e marco: note sul dibattito italiano", in: Dossier di Le monde diplomatique, n. 1, L'ingranaggio Europa, Torino, Rosenberg & Sellier, republished in: Vianello, F. [1979], Il profitto e il potere. Una raccolta di saggi (1974–1979), Torino, Rosenberg & Sellier.
- Vianello, F. [1979], "La lenta morte dello stato assistenziale" in: VV.AA., Libertà di sciopero o libertà di impresa? La politica della Confindustria tra controffensiva neo-liberista e repressione giudiziaria contro i metalmeccanici, Bari, De Donato. Published with the title: "Il mercato e la società. Aspetti di restaurazione culturale", in: Vianello, F. [1979], Il profitto e il potere. Una raccolta di saggi (1974–1979), Torino, Rosenberg & Sellier.
- Vianello, F. [1979], "Opinioni italiane e inglesi sul controllo delle importazioni", in: Mondoperaio, n. 5 1979, republished in: Vianello, F. [1979], Il profitto e il potere. Una raccolta di saggi (1974–1979), Torino, Rosenberg & Sellier.
- Vianello, F. [1981], "Commento", in: Lunghini, G. (ed.), Scelte politiche e teorie economiche in Italia 1945–1978, Torino, Einaudi, pp. 399–402, ISBN 978-88-06-51755-7.
- Vianello, F. [1982], "La cultura degli Eloi", in: VV.AA., Il concetto di sinistra, Bompiani, Milano.
- Vianello, F. [1986], "La critica dell'economia politica: ieri e oggi", in: Mancina, C. and Nassisi, A.M., Marx e il mondo contemporaneo, vol. 1, Roma, Editori Riuniti, ISBN 978-88-359-3003-7 .
- Vianello, F. [1992], "Precisazioni in tema di prezzi naturali", in: Acocella, N. and Rey, G.M. and Tiberi M. (eds.), Saggi di Politica economica in onore di Federico Caffè, vol. II, Franco Angeli, pp. 119–140, ISBN 978-88-204-7349-5.
- Vianello, F. [1993], "Umanesimo del welfare: qualche riflessione", in: Rey, G.M. and Romagnoli, G.C. (eds.), In difesa del welfare state, Milano, Angeli, ISBN 978-88-204-7687-8.
- Simonazzi, A. and Vianello, F. [1994], "Modificabilità dei tassi di cambio e restrizioni alla libertà di movimento dei capitali", in: Pizzuti, F.R. (ed.), Pragmatismo, disciplina e saggezza convenzionale. L'economia italiana dagli anni '70 agli anni '90, McGraw-Hill, Milano.
- Vianello, F. [1995], "Federico Caffè e l'intelligente pragmatismo", in: Esposito, A. and Tiberi, M. (eds.), Federico Caffè: realtà e critica del capitalismo storico, Catanzaro, Meridiana Libri, ISBN 978-88-86175-06-7.
- Bonifati, G. and Vianello, F. [1998], "Il saggio dell'interesse come fenomeno monetario e il saggio di rendimento del capitale impiegato nella produzione", in: De Vecchi, N. and Marcuzzo M.C. (eds.), A Cinquant'anni da Keynes. Teorie dell'occupazione, interesse e crescita, Milano, Unicopli, ISBN 978-88-400-0493-8.
- Simonazzi, A. and Vianello, F. [1999], "Liberalizzazione finanziaria, moneta unica europea e occupazione", in: Pizzuti, R. (ed.), Globalizzazione, istituzioni e coesione sociale, Donzelli, Roma, ISBN 978-88-86175-46-3.
- Ciampalini, A. and Vianello, F. [2000], "Concorrenza, accumulazione del capitale e saggio del profitto. Critica al moderno sottoconsumismo", in: Pivetti M. (ed.), Piero Sraffa. Contributi per una biografia intellettuale, Roma, Carocci, ISBN 978-88-430-1665-5.
- Vianello, F. [2004], "La Facoltà di Economia e Commercio di Modena", in: Garofalo, G. e Graziani A. (eds.), La formazione degli economisti in Italia (1950–1975), Bologna, Il Mulino, ISBN 978-88-15-09567-1.

== See also ==
- List of economists
- Sapienza University of Rome
- University of Modena and Reggio Emilia
- Political economy
- Piero Sraffa
- Adam Smith
- David Ricardo
- Karl Marx
- Post-Keynesian economics
- Neo-Ricardianism

== Official ==
- Official website
