= Marx After Sraffa =

1977 book by Ian Steedman

Marx after Sraffa
- Cover of the first edition
- Author: Ian Steedman
- Language: English
- Subjects: Karl Marx, labor theory of value
- Published: 1977
- Publication place: United Kingdom
- Media type: Print (Hardcover and Paperback)
- ISBN: 978-0902308497

Marx after Sraffa is a 1977 book about Marxist economics by the economist Ian Steedman, in which the author argues against the labor theory of value.

== Reception ==
The economist Heinz D. Kurz reviewed Marx after Sraffa in Kyklos. The political scientist David McLellan wrote that Steedman's reading of Marx has been influential. The philosopher Roger Scruton wrote that Steedman provides the most notable argument against the labor theory of value from the New Left. The Marxist theorist Ernest Mandel considered Marx after Sraffa as another critique of Marx's Capital, and accused Steedman of misunderstandings of Marx similar to those made by Paul Sweezy in The Theory of Capitalist Development (1942).

== See also ==
- David Ricardo
- Piero Sraffa
