= Huguette Biaujeaud =

French economist and historian of economic thought (c. 1910–1990)

- 1934 edition of Biaujeaud's treatise
- Born: c. 1910
- Died: 1990
- Known for: Essai sur la théorie ricardienne de la valeur (1934)

Academic background
- Education: University of Paris (Doctorate in law, 1933)
- Doctoral advisor: Gaëtan Pirou

Academic work
- Discipline: History of economic thought

Huguette Biaujeaud (c. 1910 – 1990) was a French economist whose only publication, Essai sur la théorie ricardienne de la valeur (Essay on the Ricardian Theory of Value; 1934), anticipated in several respects Piero Sraffa's later interpretation of David Ricardo. Written as a doctoral thesis, it was largely overlooked in France for many decades, but was cited by experts on Ricardo, including Sraffa, George Stigler, and Mark Blaug, and was reissued in 1988. Biaujeaud did not pursue a career as an economist.

== Essai sur la théorie ricardienne de la valeur ==
Biaujeaud presented her doctoral thesis to the University of Paris Faculty of Law on 2 December 1933, under the supervision of economist Gaëtan Pirou. It was published by Éditions Sirey in 1934, with a preface by Pirou, in an edition of only 200 copies. In 1988, it was reissued by Économica with a preface by Gilbert Abraham-Frois. According to Biaujeaud, her contacts with Sraffa, whom she met once, and with Jacob Hollander took place "when [her] work was already very well advanced" and "they accepted [her conclusions] without great controversy". Through these communications, she corrected some errors in Ricardo's correspondence.

The book compared the three editions of Ricardo's On the Principles of Political Economy and Taxation—1817, 1819 and 1821—particularly the opening chapter on value. Biaujeaud identified an early phase in Ricardo's thinking, where his theory of profits rested on the profit of farmers and the physical productivity of agriculture—an idea Sraffa called the "corn model" in his introduction to the 1951 Works and Correspondence of David Ricardo—and she traced Ricardo's shift towards a theory based on value, instead. Biaujeaud and Sraffa both argued—in contrast to the commonly accepted interpretation of Edwin Cannan and Jacob Hollander—that, in the third edition of the Principles, Ricardo did not retreat from the labor theory of value. Biaujeaud further argued that Ricardo had determined value by cost of production from the first edition and that, if anything, his position moved closer to a labor theory of value rather than away from it. Two decades before George Stigler published "Ricardo and the 93 percent labor theory of value" (1958), Biaujeaud noted that the passage on which Stigler's argument would depend appeared only in the third edition of Principles. Her novel conclusion was that "the labor theory of value and the cost of production theory of value coexisted parallel to one another in Ricardo's thought" and that "the true interest of the Ricardian system lies in the duality of these two theories".

== Reception ==
Despite Pirou's preface and his references to the work in later books, the Essai remained obscure in France until the 1980s. Abroad, Sraffa cited it in his 1951 preface to the Works and Correspondence of David Ricardo, Stigler took note of it in 1958, and Mark Blaug included it, as the only French work, among the twelve references in his article on Ricardo in the International Encyclopedia of the Social Sciences (1968). Abraham-Frois judges the similarity between her interpretation and Sraffa's "striking", while noting that Sraffa's treatment was much more systematic.

== Selected works ==
- Essai sur la théorie ricardienne de la valeur. Paris: Sirey, 1934 – via archive.org.
