= Curzio =

Curzio is both a given name and a surname.

== History ==
This name derives from the Latin curtĭus, which in turn derives from the Latin curtus, meaning shortened or short. The gens Curtia was an ancient but minor noble family in Rome of Samnite origin, with both patrician and plebeian branches. The only member of the gens invested with the consulship under the Republic was Gaius Curtius Philo, in 445 BC. A few Curtii held lesser magistracies during the Republic, and there were two consuls suffectus in imperial times. However, the gens is best remembered from a series of legends dating from the traditional founding of the city to the early Republic.

== Notable people with the given name ==
- Curzio Cocci (died 1621), Roman Catholic prelate
- Curzio Gonzaga (c.1530−1599), Italian nobleman, writer and diplomat
- Curzio Inghirami (1614–1655), Italian archaeologist, historian and forger of Etruscan artifacts
- Curzio Malaparte (1898–1957), Italian writer, film-maker, war correspondent and diplomat
- Curzio Maltese (1959–2023), Italian journalist and politician
- Curzio Picchena (1553—1626), Italian politician and scholar

== Notable people with the surname ==
- Alberto Quadrio Curzio (born 1937), Italian economist
- Juan Carlos Curzio, winner of the Argentine Individual Speedway Championship in 1979, 1980 and 1985
