= Ricardian economics =

Economic theories of David Ricardo

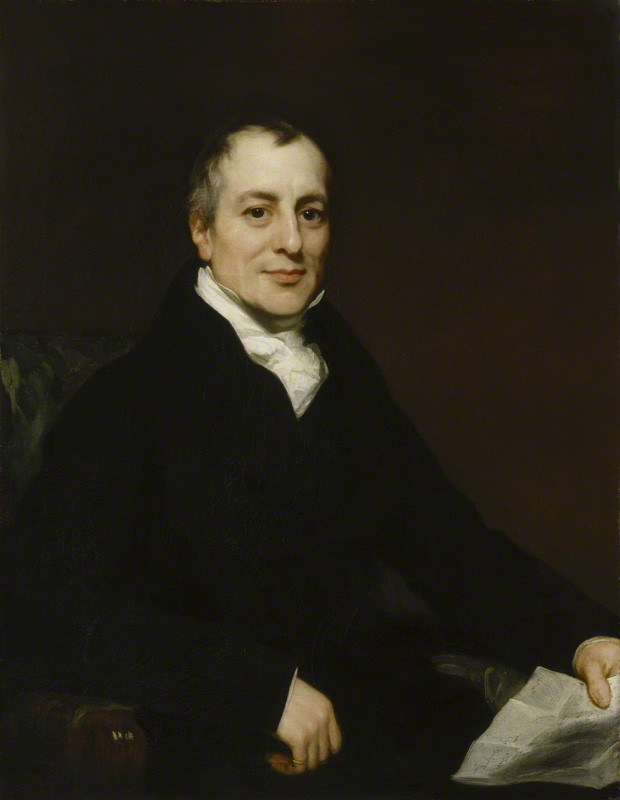
David Ricardo

Ricardian economics are the economic theories of David Ricardo, an English political economist born in 1772 who made a fortune as a stockbroker and loan broker. At the age of 27, he read An Inquiry into the Nature and Causes of Wealth of Nations by Adam Smith and was energised by the theories of economics.

His main economic ideas are contained in On the Principles of Political Economy and Taxation (1817). This set out a series of theories which would later become theoretical underpinnings of both Marx's Das Kapital and Marshallian economics, including the theory of economic rent, the labour theory of value and above all the theory of comparative advantage.

Ricardo wrote his first economic article ten years after reading Adam Smith and ultimately, the "bullion controversy" gave him fame in the economic community for his theory on inflation in 19th-century England. This theory became known as monetarism, the theory that excess currency leads to inflation. He also played a part in the emergence of classical economics, which meant he fought for free trade and free competition without government interference by enforcing laws or restrictions.

== The law of diminishing returns ==
Another idea Ricardo is known for in his Essay on the Influence of a Low Price of Corn on the Profits of Stock is the Law of Diminishing Returns (Ricardo, Economic Essays, Henderson 826). The law of diminishing returns states that if you add more units to one of the factors of production and keep the rest constant, the quantity or output created by the extra units will eventually get smaller to a point where overall output will not rise ("diminishing returns").

For example, consider a simple farm that has two inputs: labor and land. Suppose the farm has 100 hectares of land and one worker (the labor input). This land-labor combination produces some level of output. If the amount of land is increased, and the amount of labor stays the same, the worker will have to give less attention to each acre of land (provided that nothing else changes). So, output may increase, though the additional (marginal) output from adding an acre of land may decrease.

If more and more land is added that must be tended by this one worker, there will eventually be so much land that output starts to decrease as the worker becomes overwhelmed (that is, less labor time, on average, is devoted to each acre). This is the typical stylized result of increasing one productive input while holding the others constant (versus increasing all inputs, generating economies of scale).

== Comparative advantage ==
Ricardo was opposed to tariffs and other restrictions on international trade. Ricardo devised an idea that is well known as the theory of comparative advantage (Henderson 827, Fesfeld 325). According to the Washington Council on International Trade, comparative advantage is the ability to produce a good at a lower cost, relative to other goods, compared to another country. In the Principles of Economics, Ricardo states that comparative advantage is a specialization technique used to create more efficient production (52) and describes opportunity cost between producers (53). With perfect competition and undistorted markets, countries tend to export goods in which they have a comparative advantage.

For example, we should think of two countries that both make cards and pencils and use the same amount of time to make one unit of items (see table). Country one can make 4 pencils if they specialize just in pencils at the expense of one card, but this country can also make ¼ of a card at the expense of one pencil. The same logic goes for country two: if country two makes only pencils, it will make 2 pencils at the expense of 1 card.

	1 card	1 pencil
Country one	4 pencils	1/4 of a card
Country two	2 pencils	1/2 of a card

If country two specializes only in cards, it will make ½ of a card at the expense of a pencil. For this example, country one has a comparative advantage in pencils over country two (4 pencils to 2 pencils), whereas, country two has a comparative advantage in cards over country one (½ of a card to ¼ of a card). In Ricardo's idea of comparative advantage, these two countries should specialize in what they do best. According to The Fortune Encyclopedia of Economics, Ricardo's idea of comparative advantage is "the main basis for most economists' belief in free trade today" (827).

== Contemporary use ==
Though David Ricardo was of the 19th century, many people use his work in everyday economics. Ricardo's theory on economic rent consisted mostly of an agricultural model featuring farmers and landowners. Since highly productive land was desired for more crops and the market would pay the same price for crops grown on both favorable and unfavorable land, farmers were eager to pay more for highly productive land to grow more crops for the extra money (Henderson 827).

Ricardo also had another influential theory: minimum wages. He knew that once the population rose more greatly, the demand for jobs would increase, making the wages decrease to a level that would not support people because many were willing to take the low-paying jobs to survive (St. Clair 9, Fusfeld 325). This observation of minimum wage work is especially relevant today when looking at the controversy with the enforcement of a minimum wage law. In Ricardo's book, On the Principles of Political Economy and Taxation, he is saying that the jobs we give more value to are paid better than those we do not value as much (11-2).

To Ricardo, value had much to do with the cost of production, which included wages and profit (St. Clair 27) and how much you paid a worker affected the price you put on the item. He also believed the value of a product was related to the quality of labor necessary for the production (Principles of Political 5). An example of this would be paying a slightly higher price for an item that is handmade, rather than being manufactured. Though this is true, Ricardo also thought the labor or machine itself should be considered when selling an item and that a little of every item should be priced to include this factor of labor (St. Claire 24).

Ricardo addressed many of the issues we face today in our economic world, such as minimum wage and rent (Fusfeld 325). These issues are perhaps as important today as they were in the 19th century, which is why David Ricardo's economic theories are still an important part of modern economics.

== See also ==
- Neo-Ricardianism
- Ricardian socialism
