= Alberto Quadrio Curzio =

Italian professor of economics

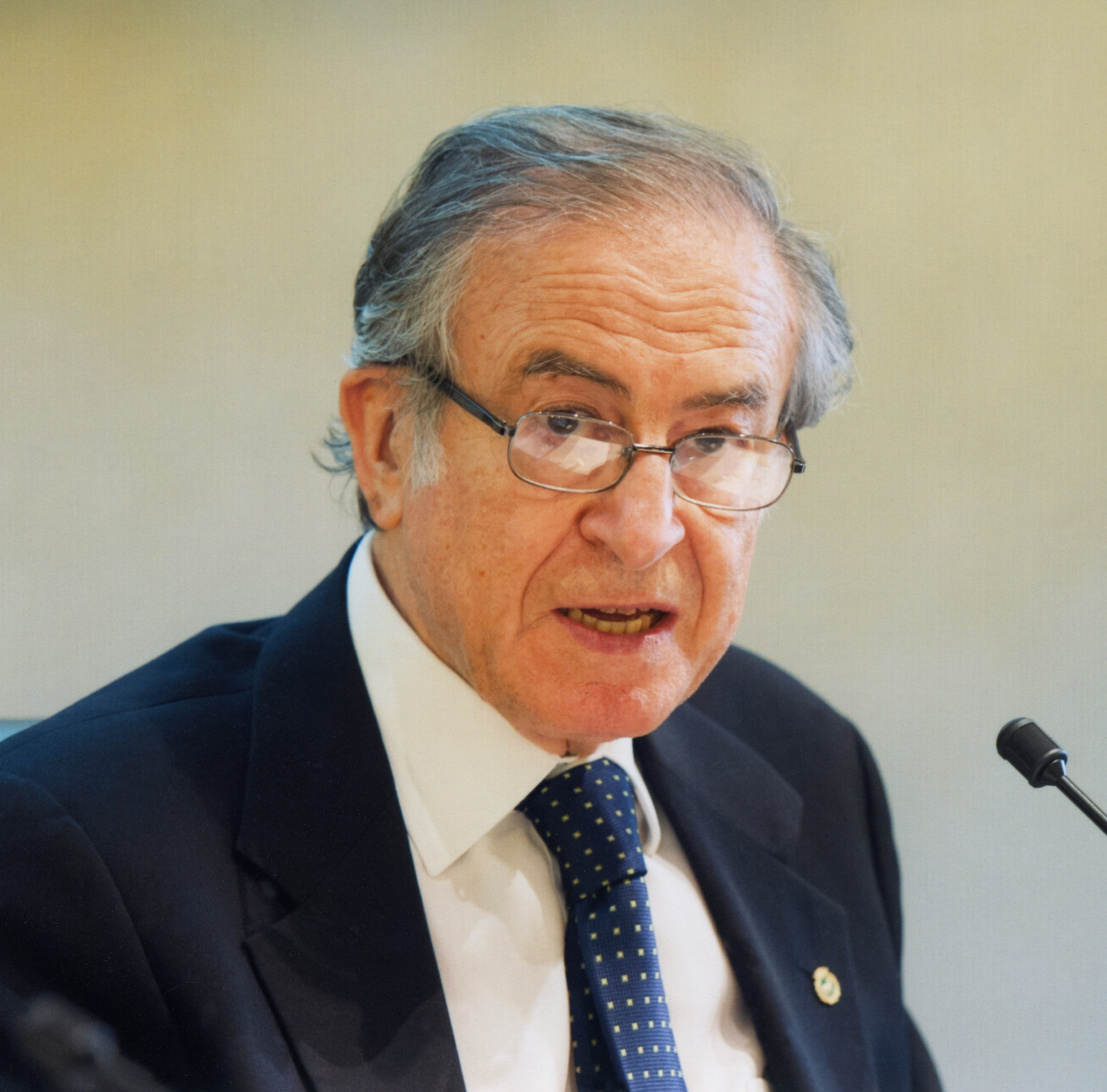
- Born: December 25, 1937 (age 88); Tirano, Lombardy, Italy
- Education: Università Cattolica del Sacro Cuore
- Scientific career
- Fields: Political Economy
- Doctoral advisor: Siro Lombardini

Alberto Quadrio Curzio (born in Tirano, Italy, December 25, 1937) is an Italian economist. He is Professor Emeritus of Political Economy at Università Cattolica del Sacro Cuore, Milan, president emeritus of the Accademia Nazionale dei Lincei.

== Biography ==
=== Academic career ===
Quadrio Cuzio graduated in political science in 1961 from Università Cattolica del Sacro Cuore, Milan, where Professor Siro Lombardini was his thesis supervisor. This was followed by a period of research at St. John's College, University of Cambridge. He has held teaching positions at the University of Cagliari, Sardinia (1965) and Bologna (1968–1975) where he became tenure track professor and dean of the Faculty of Political Science.

At Università Cattolica del Sacro Cuore, Milan, he was full professor of political economy (1976-2010), dean of the Faculty of Political Science (1989-2010) and director (1977-2010) of the Research Center of Economic Analysis and International Economic Development (CRANEC), which he founded in 1977, of which he is the chairman of the academic board since 2011, the same year he became a professor emeritus.

=== Academic roles and positions ===
Quadrio Curzio has been a member of the Accademia dei Lincei since 1996, serving as president from 2015 to 2018. He is currently its president emeritus. He was also vice president and president of the Class of Moral, Historical and Philological Sciences from 2009 to 2015.

He represented the Accademia dei Lincei at the G7 Science Academies Conferences in Germany (Berlin 2015) and Japan (Tokyo 2016). As acting president of the academy, he hosted the G7 Science Conference in Italy (Rome 2017), and coordinated the working group which issued the “Joint Statement on New economic growth: the role of science, technology, innovation and infrastructure”.

From 2020 to 2024, he was president of the Balzan International Foundation “prize” serving as vice president since 2014.

He was a member of the EIB Prize Committee (1995–2000) and president of the Bank of Italy's revolving selection committee for the “Paolo Baffi Lectures on Money and Finance” (2003). In 2002 he was part of the Reflection Group on the “Reflection Group on the Spiritual and Cultural Dimension of Europe ” initiated by the president of the European Commission, Romano Prodi, which considered the most relevant values necessary to the European unification process. His approach to politico-economic and social-institutional issues are embraced within social liberalism and liberal solidarism which led to a longstanding collaboration with Carlo Maria Martini, Archbishop of Milan.

He is chairman of the scientific board of the Fondazione Edison.

At the University of Cambridge, for the academic year 2010-2011, he was nominated distinguished academic visitor at Queens' College and visiting research fellow at the Centre for financial analysis & Policy of the judge business school. He was a member of the advisory board of the Centre for Financial History, University of Cambridge (2013–2015), president of Società italiana degli economisti (the Italian Economics Association), as well as the representative for Italian economists at the National Research Council (Italy) for 10 years. He served as president of Istituto Lombardo di scienze e lettere, member of various Italian science academies (Istituto Veneto di Scienze, Lettere ed Arti, Accademia Pontaniana, Accademia delle scienze dell'Istituto di Bologna) of the Academia Europaea (in the Economics, Business and Management Sciences section) and of the Royal Economic Society.

He is a member of various boards and committees at Il Mulino publishers, Aspen Institute Italia, Fondazione Compagnia di SanPaolo well as of many other important scientific and cultural institutes.

In 1984 he founded and became editor-in-chief of Economia politica. Journal of Analytical and Institutional Economics first published by Il Mulino and since 2015 co-published by Il Mulino and Springer.

Since 2019, he has been an ambassador for the Organization for Women in Science for the Developing World (OWSD), a UNESCO organization part of Academy of Sciences for the Developing World (TWAS) of which he is a steering committee member.

He sits on the editorial board of several international journals. He has organized innumerable seminars, held lectures and conferences in many universities, academic and cultural institutions in Italy and abroad. Since the second half of the 1980s to 2019 he regularly wrote editorials for Il Sole 24 Ore. He has been also writing editorials for Huffington Post Italia since 2019. As of September 2020, he is a member of the Italian Aspen Institute.

=== Competitive sports ===
In his youth, Alberto Quadrio Curzio, was a successful and talented alpine skier (in Bormio was trained by the Olympic champion Stefano Sertorelli). He was the only skier, along with Gustav Thöni, to win the Italian Junior Championships in all three disciplines in 1955. He decided to leave competitive skiing on the eve of the 1955 Cortina d'Ampezzo Winter Olympics to concentrate on his studies. Mario Cotelli (Coach and Technical Director for the Italian National alpine skiing team in the seventies) wrote that A. Quadrio Curzio was the precursor of the “independent ski action technique” (later adopted by J.C.Killy) and the “push step technique” (later used by G.Thoeni) .

== Scientific contributions ==
His research has mainly focused on three streams of analysis:

a) Theory of scarce resources and of structural dynamics, with significant contributions to the theory of rent and technical progress. Already since the second half of the 1960s, he has shown, through the use of multisector analytical methods, how changes in structural technologies and technical progress could depend both on income distribution with rents explicitly considered and on the achievement of a scarcity limit of some resource, or on the mix of the two mentioned elements. With other analytical methods, he also examined the role of investments in education on economic growth.

b) Institutional and applied economics, with specific reference to the European and Italian economies, highlighting two types of factors for development: the relations between institutions, the society and the economy, on the one hand and on the other, the interactions among the various levels of subsidiarity (vertical and horizontal) as pillars of social liberalism.

c) The history of political economic thought, with particular reference to Italy, starting from concepts on Enlightenment developed around Cesare Beccaria, from the second half of the 1700s and subsequent extensions, up to more recent times, identifying a stream of thought which unites civil progress (of institutionalist economists) with technical-scientific progress (of engineering economists) in creative and sustainable development. Regarding the more properly institutional and social aspects, he has given appreciable attention to subsidiarity and solidarity which find their roots also in Christian social thought.

His scholarly works are mostly collected in a key bibliography and thoroughly examined in a Festschrift edited by Gilberto Antonelli, Mario Maggioni, Giovanni Pegoretti, Fausta Pellizzari, Roberto Scazzieri, Roberto Zoboli «Economia come scienza sociale. Teoria, istituzioni, storia. Studi in onore di Alberto Quadrio Curzio» called «Economia come scienza sociale. Teoria, istituzioni, storia. Studi in onore di Alberto Quadrio Curzio» - published by Il Mulino in 2012 with contributions from 32 of his colleagues (many of whom were once his students). A further Festschrift was dedicated to him in a volume edited by Mauro L. Baranzini, Claudia Rotondi, Roberto Scazzieri «Resources, Production and Structural Dynamics» entitled «Resources, Production and Structural Dynamics» - published by Cambridge University Press in 2015. This book contains contributions by Mauro L. Baranzini, Claudia Rotondi, Roberto Scazzieri, Luigi L. Pasinetti, D'Maris Dalton Coffman, Heinz D. Kurz, Neri Salvadori, Piercarlo Nicola, Albert E. Steenge, Carlo D'Adda, Faye Duchin, Heinrich Bortis, Kumaraswamy Vela Velupillai, Michael A. Landesmann, Ivano Cardinale, Lilia Costabile, Constanze Dobler, Harald Hagemann, Alessandro Roncaglia, Stefano Zamagni, Pier Luigi Porta, Moshe Syrquin, Marco Fortis, Sunanda Sen, Andrea Goldstein, Keun Lee, Antonio Andreoni. Lastly, other scholarly contributions were assessed in «A compendium of Italian economists at Oxbridge» edited by Mauro L. Baranzini and Amalia Mirante «A compendium of Italian economists at Oxbridge» (Palgrave MacMillan, 2016). In it is an extremely effective evaluation, especially of his research in the first stream of analysis.

== Publications ==
He has published more than 400 works, many in English – one book was translated into Chinese. The Econlit database contains more than 100 records of articles, works, and books either written or edited by Alberto Quadrio Curzio. Some of his main works include:

- Rendita e distribuzione in un modello economico plurisettoriale, Giuffrè, Milano, 1967.
- Investimenti in istruzione e sviluppo economico, Il Mulino, Bologna, 1973.
- Accumulazione del capitale e rendita, Il Mulino, Bologna, 1975.
- Rent, Income distribution and orders of efficiency and rentability, in L. Pasinetti (a cura di), Essays on the theory of joint production, Macmillan, Londra, 1980.
- Un diagramma dell'oro tra demonetizzazione e rimonetizzazione, in «Rivista Internazionale di Scienze Economiche e Commerciali», n. 10-11, ottobre-novembre, 1981, pp. 915–940.
- Sui momenti costitutivi dell'economia politica (con R. Scazzieri), Collana “Protagonisti del pensiero economico”, Il Mulino, Bologna, 1983.
- Technological scarcity: an essay on production and structural change, in M. Baranzini e R. Scazzieri (a cura di), Foundations of Economics. Structures of inquiry and economic theory, Basil Blackwell, 1986, pp. 311–338.
- The exchange production duality and the dynamics of economic knowledge (con R. Scazzieri), in M. Baranzini e R. Scazzieri (a cura di), Foundations of Economics. Structures of inquiry and economic theory, Basil Blackwell, 1986, pp. 377–407.
- The gold problem: economic perspectives, (curatore), Oxford University Press, Oxford 1982; tradotto anche in italiano (1989) ed in cinese (1988)
- Rent, Distribution and Economic Structure: a collection of essays, "Quaderni IDSE", n.1, CNR, Milano, 1990.
- Structural Rigidities and Dynamic Choice of Technologies (con F. Pellizzari), in «Rivista Internazionale di Scienze Economiche e Commerciali», anno XXXVIII, n. 6-7, Milano, giugno-luglio, 1991, pp. 481–517.
- On economic science, its tools and economic reality, in M. Baranzini and G.C. Harcourt (a cura di), The Dynamics of the Wealth of Nations. Growth, Distribution and Structural Change, St. Martin Press, New York, 1993, pp. 246–271.
- Il pianeta diviso. Geo-economia dello sviluppo, Vita e Pensiero, Milano, 1994.
- Innovation, Resources and Economic Growth: Changing Interactions in the World Economy, in Quadrio Curzio A.-Fortis M.-Zoboli R. (eds.), "Innovation, Resources and Economic Growth", Springer-Verlag, Berlin-Heidelberg, 1994
- Risorse, Tecnologie, Rendita (con F. Pellizzari), Il Mulino, Bologna, 1996.
- Noi, l'economia e l'Europa, Bologna, Il Mulino, 1996. Ristampa con Post-fazione, novembre 1996.
- Growth and Productive Structure: A medium-Term Perspective (con M.Fortis), in B.Colombo, P.Demeny e M.F.Perutz (eds.), Resources and Population. Natural, Institutional, and Demographic Dimensions of Development (Atti della settimana di Studio “Risorse e Popolazione” del 17-22 novembre 1991), Clarendon Press, Oxford, 1996, pp. 137–156
- Rent, in H.D.Kurz e N. Salvadori (eds.), “Elgar Companion to Classical Economics (ECCE)”, Edward Elgar, Cheltenham, 1998, pp. 289–293
- Extensive and Intensive rent (con F.Pellizzari), in H.D.Kurz e N. Salvadori (eds.), “Elgar Companion to Classical Economics (ECCE)”, Edward Elgar, Cheltenham, 1998, pp.279-283
- Rent, Resources, Technologies (con F. Pellizzari), Springer-Verlag, Berlin-Heidelberg, 1999.
- Complexity and industrial clusters. Dynamics and models in theory and practice, (a cura di, in collaborazione con M. Fortis), Physica-Verlag, Heidelberg, pp. 307, 2002. Versione Italiana Quadrio Curzio, A., Fortis, M. (a cura di), Complessità e distretti induatriali. Dinamiche, modelli, casi reali, Bologna, Il Mulino, n°4 collana della Fondazione Edison, 2002
- Sussidiarietà e sviluppo. Paradigmi per l'Europa e per l'Italia, Vita e Pensiero, Milano, 2002.
- Technological Scarcity: an Essay on Production and Structural Change, in H. Hagemann, M. Landesmann, R. Scazzieri (a cura di), The Economics of Structural Change, Edward Elgar, vol. II, 2003, pp. 138–165.
- Europe and Italy: Economic and Institutional Relationship, in «Risec, Rivista internazionale di Scienze economiche e Commerciali, Issue in Honour of Mario Talamona», vol. LI, n. 1, marzo, 2004, pp. 125–132.
- Rent, Technology, and the Environment (con F. Pellizzari), in R. Arena e N. Salvadori (a cura di), Money, Credit and the Role of the State, Essay in Honour of Augusto Graziani, Ashgate, Burlington, USA, 2004, pp. 335–348.
- Research and Technological Innovation: the challenge for a new Europe, (editor con M. Fortis), Physica-Verlag, Heidelberg 2005
- Economisti ed Economia. Per un'Italia europea: paradigmi tra il XVIII e il XX secolo, Il Mulino, Bologna, 2007.
- Historical stylizations and monetary theory (con R. Scazzieri), in R. Scazzieri, A. Sen e S. Zamagni (a cura di), Markets, Money and Capital. Hicksian Economics for the Twenty-First Century, Cambridge University Press, 2008, pp. 185–203.
- The EU and the Economies of the Eastern European Enlargement, (ed. with M. Fortis), Physica-Verlag, Heidelberg, 2008
- Reflections on the Crisis 2007-2008 (a cura di), in «Economia politica. Journal of Analytical and Institutional Economics», 3/2008, pp. 369–380.
- I fondi sovrani (con V. Miceli), collana "Farsi un'idea", Il Mulino, Bologna, 2009.
- The Greek Crisis and the European Crisis. How to Face Them, in «Economia Politica. Journal of Analytical and Institutional Economics», anno XXVII, n. 1, aprile, 2010, pp. 3–8.
- Sovereign Wealth Funds. A complete guide to state-owned investment funds (con V. Miceli), Harriman House, Petersfield, UK, 2010.
- La Facoltà di Scienze Politiche della Università Cattolica 1989-2010. Profili istituzionali e internazionali nella interdisciplinarietà, Vita e Pensiero, Milano, 2011.
- Economia oltre la crisi, La Scuola, Brescia, 2012.
- L' Europa tra ripresa e squilibri: Eurozona, Germania e Italia (con Marco Fortis), Il Mulino, Bologna, 2014.
- L'economia reale nel Mezzogiorno (a cura di, con Marco Fortis), Il Mulino, Bologna, 2014.
- Il ruolo strategico del sistema metalmeccanico italiano: dai metalli alla meccatronica (a cura di, con Marco Fortis), Il Mulino, Bologna, 2015.
- Riforme, ripresa, rilancio: Europa e Italia (con Marco Fortis), Il Mulino, Bologna, 2016.
- Eurobonds for EMU stability and structural growth, in I.Cardinale, D.Coffman, R.Scazzieri (eds), The Political Economy of the Eurozone, Cambridge University Press, 2017, pp. 395–434

== Decorations ==
=== National honours ===
2000: Italian Medal of Merit for Culture and Art — Conferred by the President of the Republic, Carlo Azeglio Ciampi, September 29th, 2000

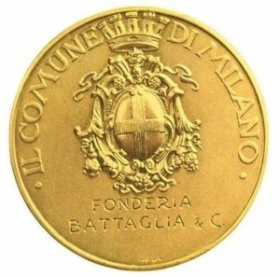
2011: Ambrogino d'oro — Conferred by Giuliano Pisapia, Mayor of the City of Milan

2019: Knight Grand Cross of the Order of Merit of the Italian Republic — Conferred by the President of the Republic, Sergio Mattarella

=== Holy honours ===
1994: Knight Commander of the Order of St. Gregory the Great — Conferred by Pope John Paul II and delivered by the Secretary of State of the Holy See Cardinal Angelo Sodano

2014: Knight Grand Cross of the Order of St. Gregory the Great — Conferred by Pope Francis and delivered by the Secretary of State of the Holy See Cardinal Pietro Parolin

2017: Knight of the Order of Pope Pius IX — Conferred by Pope Francis and delivered by the Secretary of State Cardinal Pietro Parolin
