= Labini =

Labini is an Italian surname. Notable people with the surname include:

- Paolo Sylos Labini (1920–2005), Italian economist and political advisor
- Vincenzo Labini (1735–1807), Italian archbishop
