= Franklin Serrano =

Brazilian economist and professor

- Born: Rio de Janeiro, Brazil

Academic background
- Education: Federal University of Rio de Janeiro, University of Cambridge
- Influences: Piero Sraffa, Pierangelo Garegnani

Academic work
- Discipline: Economics
- School or tradition: Neo-Ricardian school
- Institutions: Federal University of Rio de Janeiro

Franklin Leon Peres Serrano is a Brazilian economist and professor at the Federal University of Rio de Janeiro.

== Biography ==
He is currently an associate professor at the Federal University of Rio de Janeiro and an associate editor of the Review of Keynesian Economics magazine (ROKE).

He has experience in topics related to economics and political economy, acting mainly on the following themes: growth, external restriction, effective demand, Sraffian economy.

He holds a bachelor's degree in economics at the Pontifical Catholic University of Rio de Janeiro (1983), a master's degree in economics at federal University of Rio de Janeiro (1988) and a PhD in economics at University of Cambridge (1996).

== Selected works ==
- SERRANO, Franklin. (1995) "The Sraffian Supermultiplier." University of Cambridge. United Kingdom. (PhD Thesis)
- SERRANO, Franklin. (1995) "Long period effective demand and the Sraffian supermultiplier." Contributions to Political Economy, 14(1), 67-90.
- SERRANO, Franklin & MAZAT, Numa. (2015). "An analysis of the Soviet economic growth from the 1950’s to the collapse of USSR."
- SERRANO, Franklin & FREITAS, Fábio. (2015). Growth rate and level effects, the stability of the adjustment of capacity to demand and the Sraffian supermultiplier. Review of Political Economy, 27(3), 258-281.
- SERRANO, Franklin & FREITAS, Fábio. (2017). The Sraffian supermultiplier as an alternative closure for heterodox growth theory. European Journal of Economics and Economic Policies: Intervention, 14(1), 70-91.
- SERRANO, Franklin & FREITAS, Fábio & BHERING, Gustavo. (2019). Thirlwall's law, external debt sustainability, and the balance-of-payments-constrained level and growth rates of output. Review of Keynesian Economics, 7(4), 486-497.
- SERRANO, Franklin & SUMMA, Ricardo & MOREIRA, Vivian. (2020). Stagnation and unnaturally low interest rates: a simple critique of the amended New Consensus and the Sraffian supermultiplier alternative. Review of Keynesian Economics, 8(3), 365-384.
- SERRANO, Franklin & MEDEIROS, Carlos. (2020). O desenvolvimento econômico e a retomada da abordagem clássica do excedente. Brazilian Journal of Political Economy, 24, 244-263.
