= Samuel Hollander =

British economist (born 1937)

- שמואל הולנדר
- Born: 6 April 1937 (age 89); London, England
- Education: London School of Economics; Princeton University
- Awards: Order of Canada
- Scientific career
- Fields: Economics
- Workplaces: University of Toronto; Ben-Gurion University of the Negev
- Thesis: The Sources of Increased Efficiency: A Case Study of Du Pont Rayon Manufacturing Plants (1963)
- Doctoral advisor: Fritz Machlup

Samuel Hollander, OC FRSC (Hebrew: שמואל הולנדר; born 6 April 1937) is a British–Canadian–Israeli economist.

Born in London, he received a B.Sc. in economics from the London School of Economics in 1959, followed by an A.M. degree from Princeton University in 1961. In 1963, he completed his Princeton Ph.D. dissertation on industrial efficiency in rayon production at DuPont, having worked under the supervision of Fritz Machlup.

He spent his academic career at the University of Toronto, becoming an assistant professor (1963–1966), associate professor (1966–1970), professor (1970–1984), university professor (1984–1998), and upon his retirement in 1998, university professor emeritus. In 2000, he took up the position of a professor at Ben-Gurion University of the Negev. He became a citizen of Canada in 1967 and of Israel in 2000.

Samuel Hollander is one of the most influential and controversial living scholars of the history of economic thought, and has specialized in classical economics. He has published monumental studies of Adam Smith, David Ricardo, Thomas Malthus, John Stuart Mill and Karl Marx. Especially his "new view" of David Ricardo as a direct predecessor of neo-classical economists such as Alfred Marshall and Léon Walras triggered debates, but won over a number of prominent fellow economists (including Martin Bronfenbrenner). His work was recommended by Lionel Robbins who wrote, "... he really surpasses all previous historians of economic thought, especially on Ricardo" (Robbins, 1998, p. 143).

== Main publications ==
1. Studies in Classical Political Economy/I The Economics of Adam Smith (Toronto: University of Toronto Press and London: Heinemann), 1973, x + 350.
2. Studies in Classical Political Economy/II The Economics of David Ricardo (Toronto: UTP and London: Heinemann), 1979, xiv + 759.
3. Studies in Classical Political Economy/III The Economics of John Stuart Mill (Toronto: UTP and Oxford: Blackwell), 1985: Volume I, Theory and Method, xx + 481. Volume II, Political Economy, 482–1030.
4. Classical Economics (Oxford: Blackwell, 1987; Toronto: UTP, 1992), x + 485.
5. Collected Essays/I Ricardo. The ‘New View’ (London and New York: Routledge), 1995, xiv + 369.
6. Studies in Classical Political Economy/IV The Economics of Thomas Robert Malthus (Toronto: UTP), 1997, xviii + 1045.
7. Collected Essays/II The Literature of Political Economy (London and New York: Routledge), 1998, xv + 410.
8. Collected Essays/III John Stuart Mill on Economic Theory and Method (London and New York: Routledge), 2000, xiii + 299.
9. Jean-Baptiste Say and the Classical Canon in Economics: the British Connection in French Classicism (London and New York: Routledge), 2005, xiii + 322.
10. Studies in Classical Political Economy/V. The Economics of Karl Marx: Analysis and Application (Historical Perspectives on Modern Economics) (Cambridge University Press), 2008, 552.
11. Friedrich Engels and Marxian Political Economy (Historical Perspectives on Modern Economics) (forthcoming Cambridge University Press, April 2011)

== Honours ==
- In 1976 he was made a Fellow of the Royal Society of Canada.
- In 1998 he was made an Officer of the Order of Canada.
- In 1999 he was made a Distinguished Fellow of the History of Economics Society (citation).

== Sources ==
- Official website: http://www.samuel-hollander.com/
- "Prof Samuel Hollander". Ben Gurion University of the Negev Department of Economics. Archived from the original on 20 April 2008.
- ‘It’s an ill wind’... Autobiographical memoir from the book Collected Essays/II The Literature of Political Economy (1998)
