= Neo-Ricardianism =

Economic school of thought based on David Ricardo's works

The neo-Ricardian school is an economic school of thought that derives from the close reading and interpretation of David Ricardo by Piero Sraffa, and from Sraffa's critique of neoclassical economics as presented in his The Production of Commodities by Means of Commodities, and further developed by the neo-Ricardians in the course of the Cambridge capital controversy. It particularly disputes the neoclassical theory of income distribution. Robert Rowthorn, in his 1974 article, "Neo-classicism, neo-Ricardianism and Marxism" in New Left Review coined the name. Franklin Delano Roosevelt III, with his dissertation, Towards a Marxist Critique of the Cambridge School, put forth a similar view. The name "Sraffian economics" is also used.

Prominent neo-Ricardians are usually held to include Pierangelo Garegnani, Krishna Bharadwaj, Luigi Pasinetti, Joan Robinson, John Eatwell, Fernando Vianello, Murray Milgate, Ian Steedman, Heinz D. Kurz, Neri Salvadori, Bertram Schefold, Fabio Petri, Massimo Pivetti, Franklin Serrano, Fabio Ravagnani, Roberto Ciccone, Sergio Parrinello, Alessandro Roncaglia, Maurice Dobb, Gilbert Abraham-Frois, Theodore Mariolis and Giorgio Gilibert.

The school partially overlaps with post-Keynesian and neo-Marxian economics.

== See also ==
- Cambridge capital controversy
- Okishio's theorem
- Ricardian economics
- Capital accumulation
