= Hollander tax =

Land tax

The Hollander Tax was a land tax put in place in 1900 by the Puerto Rico's US-appointed Treasurer, Jacob Hollander shortly after the acquisition of the island by the United States following the Spanish American War. It exempted lands priced below $100 and thus fell squarely on middle- and high-income landowners. Because there were no usury laws applicable in Puerto Rico like there were in the United States, interest rates spiked. It is often attributed as being a cause of the shift of land ownership to US banks. The implementation of this law coincided with an artificial devaluation of the Puerto Rican peso by US authorities.
