= Classical economics =

School of thought in economics

Classical economics, also known as the classical school of economics or classical political economy, is a school of thought in political economy that flourished primarily in Britain in the late 18th and early-to-mid 19th century. It includes both the Smithian and Ricardian schools. Its main thinkers are held to be Adam Smith, Jean-Baptiste Say, David Ricardo, Thomas Robert Malthus, and John Stuart Mill. These economists produced a theory of market economies as largely self-regulating systems, governed by natural laws of production and exchange (famously captured by Adam Smith's metaphor of the invisible hand).

Adam Smith's The Wealth of Nations in 1776 is usually considered to mark the beginning of classical economics. The fundamental message in Smith's book was that the wealth of any nation was determined not by the gold in the monarch's coffers, but by its national income. This income was in turn based on the labor of its inhabitants, organized efficiently by the division of labour and the use of accumulated capital, which became one of classical economics' central concepts.

In terms of economic policy, the classical economists were pragmatic liberals, advocating the freedom of the market, though they saw a role for the state in providing for the common good. Smith acknowledged that there were areas where the market is not the best way to serve the common interest, and he took it as a given that the greater proportion of the costs supporting the common good should be borne by those best able to afford them. He warned repeatedly of the dangers of monopoly, and stressed the importance of competition. In terms of international trade, the classical economists were advocates of free trade, which distinguishes them from their mercantilist predecessors, who advocated protectionism.

The designation of Smith, Ricardo and some earlier economists as "classical" is due to a canonization which stems from Karl Marx's critique of political economy, where he critiqued those that he at least perceived as worthy of dealing with, as opposed to their "vulgar" successors. There is some debate about what is covered by the term classical economics, particularly when dealing with the period from 1830 to 1875, and how classical economics relates to neoclassical economics.

== History ==
The classical economists produced their "magnificent dynamics" during a period in which capitalism was emerging from feudalism and in which the Industrial Revolution was leading to vast changes in society. These changes raised the question of how a society could be organized around a system in which every individual sought his or her own (monetary) gain. Classical political economy is popularly associated with the idea that free markets can regulate themselves.

Classical economists and their immediate predecessors reoriented economics away from an analysis of the ruler's personal interests to broader national interests. Adam Smith, following the physiocrat François Quesnay, identified the wealth of a nation with the yearly national income, instead of the king's treasury. Smith saw this income as produced by labour, land, and capital. With property rights to land and capital held by individuals, the national income is divided up between labourers, landlords, and capitalists in the form of wages, rent, and interest or profits. In his vision, productive labour was the true source of income, while capital was the main organizing force, boosting labour's productivity and inducing growth.

Ricardo and James Mill systematized Smith's theory. Their ideas became economic orthodoxy in the period ca. 1815–1848, after which an "anti-Ricardian reaction" took shape, especially on the European continent, that eventually became marginalist/neoclassical economics. The definitive split is typically placed somewhere in the 1870s, after which the torch of Ricardian economics was carried mainly by Marxian economics, while neoclassical economics became the new orthodoxy also in the English-speaking world.

Henry George is sometimes known as the last classical economist or as a bridge. The economist Mason Gaffney documented original sources that appear to confirm his thesis arguing that neoclassical economics arose as a concerted effort to suppress the ideas of classical economics and those of Henry George in particular.

=== Modern legacy ===
Classical economics and many of its ideas remain fundamental in economics, though the theory itself has yielded, since the 1870s, to neoclassical economics. Other ideas have either disappeared from neoclassical discourse or been replaced by Keynesian economics in the Keynesian Revolution and neoclassical synthesis. Some classical ideas are represented in various schools of heterodox economics, notably Georgism and Marxian economics – Marx and Henry George being contemporaries of classical economists – and Austrian economics, which split from neoclassical economics in the late 19th century. In the mid-20th century, a renewed interest in classical economics gave rise to the neo-Ricardian school and its offshoots.

== Classical international trade economics ==
Adam Smith refuted Mercantilist thought with his most influential publication: An Inquiry into the Nature and Causes of the Wealth of Nations. He argued against mercantilism, and instead favored free trade and free markets, while believing that this would favor the countries who participate in free trade. He elucidated that mercantilist policies would benefit domestic producers but not the country because it prevents consumers buying products at competitive prices, therefore directing cashflow ineffectively. Smith believed that deviating from free trade costs society in a similar manner as to how monopolies negatively affect competition in a market.

During the classical era and after Adam Smith, David Ricardo became a prominent economist with thoughts on international trade. Ricardo’s most famous economic theory was the theory of comparative advantage as the foundation of the international division of labor. He argued that international trade, in any case, would increase the standard of living. His main idea on international trade was that while it does add to real output produced in a country, the main benefits are derived from the encouragement of specialization and the division of labor on an international scale, leading to a more effective use of resources in all countries involved. One of Ricardo’s greatest assumptions and observations was that the factors of production are immobile between countries while finished goods are perfectly mobile, this assumption was critical to depict the advantages of international trade and specialization. His theory on international trade was weakened by how the labor theory of value clashes with the theory of comparative advantage. Ultimately both theories collide with a question on how the price is relatively determined and Ricardo simply stated that it does not hold in international trade theory.

John Stuart Mill would later come and solve this dilemma and further build upon Ricardo’s theory of comparative advantage. John Stuart Mill’s contribution to Ricardo’s theory of comparative advantage came about when he introduced demand to the equation. Mill introduced demand and was the first to promote the idea that demand and supply are functions of price, and the market equilibrium is where price is adjusted to where there is equilibrium between supply and demand. Overall, prior to Adam Smith and the classical economic wave, the main view of international trade was viewed negatively and not in favor of the countries who would participate in international trade with the economic policies of mercantilism. However, once Adam Smith, David Ricardo, and John Stuart Mill arrived with the classical wave of economics, international trade came to be viewed favorably and ultimately beneficial for all parties involved.

== Classical theories of growth and development ==
Analyzing the growth in the wealth of nations and advocating policies to promote such growth was a major focus of most classical economists. However, John Stuart Mill believed that a future stationary state of a constant population size and a constant stock of capital was both inevitable, necessary and desirable for mankind to achieve. This is now known as a steady-state economy.

John Hicks & Samuel Hollander, Nicholas Kaldor, Luigi L. Pasinetti and Paul A. Samuelson have presented formal models as part of their respective interpretations of classical political economy.

== Classical theories of poverty ==
Adam Smith attributed poverty to several factors, including; low wages and the suppression of their increases, barriers to education, collusion between the wealthy in markets, and neglect by the government to provide public incentives to participate in the economy. Improving these factors meant ensuring laborers were given fair wages, breaking up monopolies, and maintaining infrastructure like roads and schools so that all members of society, including the poor, could benefit. Thomas Malthus theorized that poverty was caused by unchecked population growth, and the widespread famine that accompanied it would naturally correct it. He saw population growth as exponential while food growth was linear. He also saw government support as risky, fearing it would encourage dependency on welfare and further increases to the population. He encouraged people to exercise restraint and delay marriage and childbirth. To him, poverty was a natural check on the growth of the population to ensure it didn't get out of hand.

As the classical political economy theory was being developed by the likes of Adam Smith, David Ricardo, John Stuart Mill and Thomas Malthus in the 18^{th} and 19^{th} century, thinking regarding poverty developed with it. There began to emerge more scientific economic mechanisms with which it was possible to analyze poverty at a deeper level. Adam Smith argued that economic growth can improve overall wealth and living standards, advocating for specialization and the division of labor. In The Wealth of Nations, Smith emphasizes that expanding markets increase productivity, which allows for higher wages and increased production of goods making them more accessible to the poorest members in society.

== Value theory ==
Classical economists developed a theory of value, or price, to investigate economic dynamics. In political economics, value usually refers to the value of exchange, which is separate from the price. William Petty introduced a fundamental distinction between market price and natural price to facilitate the portrayal of regularities in prices. Market prices are jostled by many transient influences that are difficult to theorize about at any abstract level. Natural prices, according to Petty, Smith, and Ricardo, for example, capture systematic and persistent forces operating at a point in time. Market prices always tend toward natural prices in a process that Smith described as somewhat similar to gravitational attraction.

The theory of what determined natural prices varied within the classical school. Petty tried to develop a par between land and labour and had what might be called a land-and-labour theory of value. Smith confined the labour theory of value to a mythical pre-capitalist past. Others may interpret Smith to have believed in value as derived from labour. He stated that natural prices were the sum of natural rates of wages, profits (including interest on capital and wages of superintendence) and rent. Ricardo also had what might be described as a cost of production theory of value. He criticized Smith for describing rent as price-determining, instead of price-determined, and saw the labour theory of value as a good approximation.

Some historians of economic thought, in particular, Sraffian economists, see the classical theory of prices as determined from three givens:

1. The level of outputs at the level of Smith's "effectual demand",
2. technology, and
3. wages.

From these givens, one can rigorously derive a theory of value. But neither Ricardo nor Marx, the most rigorous investigators of the theory of value during the Classical period, developed this theory fully. Those who reconstruct the theory of value in this manner see the determinants of natural prices as being explained by the classical economists from within the theory of economics, albeit at a lower level of abstraction. For example, the theory of wages was closely connected to the theory of population. The classical economists took the theory of the determinants of the level and growth of population as part of Political Economy. Since then, the theory of population has been seen as part of Demography. In contrast to the Classical theory, the following determinants of the neoclassical theory value are seen as exogenous to neoclassical economics:

1. tastes
2. technology, and
3. endowments.

Classical economics tended to stress the benefits of trade. Its theory of value was largely displaced by marginalist schools of thought which sees "use value" as deriving from the marginal utility that consumers find in a good, and "exchange value" (i.e. natural price) as determined by the marginal opportunity- or disutility-cost of the inputs that make up the product. Ironically, considering the attachment of many classical economists to the free market, the largest school of economic thought that still adheres to classical form is the Marxian school.

== Monetary theory ==
British classical economists in the 19th century had a well-developed controversy between the Banking and the Currency School. This parallels recent debates between proponents of the theory of endogeneous money, such as Nicholas Kaldor, and monetarists, such as Milton Friedman. Monetarists and members of the currency school argued that banks can and should control the supply of money. According to their theories, inflation is caused by banks issuing an excessive supply of money. According to proponents of the theory of endogenous money, the supply of money automatically adjusts to the demand, and banks can only control the terms and conditions (e.g., the rate of interest) on which loans are made.

== Debates on the definition ==
The theory of value is currently a contested subject. One issue is whether classical economics is a forerunner of neoclassical economics or a school of thought that had a distinct theory of value, distribution, and growth.

The period 1830–1875 is a timeframe of significant debate. Karl Marx originally coined the term "classical economics" to refer to Ricardian economics – the economics of David Ricardo and James Mill and their predecessors – but usage was subsequently extended to include the followers of Ricardo.

Sraffians, who emphasize the discontinuity thesis, see classical economics as extending from Petty's work in the 17th century to the break-up of the Ricardian system around 1830. The period between 1830 and the 1870s would then be dominated by "vulgar political economy", as Karl Marx characterized it. Sraffians argue that: the wages fund theory; Senior's abstinence theory of interest, which puts the return to capital on the same level as returns to land and labour; the explanation of equilibrium prices by well-behaved supply and demand functions; and Say's law, are not necessary or essential elements of the classical theory of value and distribution. Perhaps Schumpeter's view that John Stuart Mill put forth a half-way house between classical and neoclassical economics is consistent with this view.

Georgists and other modern classical economists and historians such as Michael Hudson argue that a major division between classical and neo-classical economics is the treatment or recognition of economic rent. Most modern economists no longer recognize land/location as a factor of production, often claiming that rent is non-existent. Georgists and others argue that economic rent remains roughly a third of economic output.

Sraffians generally see Marx as having rediscovered and restated the logic of classical economics, albeit for his own purposes. Others, such as Schumpeter, think of Marx as a follower of Ricardo. Even Samuel Hollander has recently explained that there is a textual basis in the classical economists for Marx's reading, although he does argue that it is an extremely narrow set of texts.

Another position is that neoclassical economics is essentially continuous with classical economics. To scholars promoting this view, there is no hard and fast line between classical and neoclassical economics. There may be shifts of emphasis, such as between the long run and the short run and between supply and demand, but the neoclassical concepts are to be found confused or in embryo in classical economics. To these economists, there is only one theory of value and distribution. Alfred Marshall is a well-known promoter of this view. Samuel Hollander is probably its best current proponent.

Still another position sees two threads simultaneously being developed in classical economics. In this view, neoclassical economics is a development of certain exoteric (popular) views in Adam Smith. Ricardo was a sport, developing certain esoteric (known by only the select) views in Adam Smith. This view can be found in W. Stanley Jevons, who referred to Ricardo as something like "that able, but wrong-headed man" who put economics on the "wrong track". One can also find this view in Maurice Dobb's Theories of Value and Distribution Since Adam Smith: Ideology and Economic Theory (1973), as well as in Karl Marx's Theories of Surplus Value.

The above does not exhaust the possibilities. John Maynard Keynes thought of classical economics as starting with Ricardo and being ended by the publication of his own General Theory of Employment Interest and Money. The defining criterion of classical economics, on this view, is Say's law which is disputed by Keynesian economics. Keynes was aware, though, that his usage of the term 'classical' was non-standard.

One difficulty in these debates is that the participants are frequently arguing about whether there is a non-neoclassical theory that should be reconstructed and applied today to describe capitalist economies. Some, such as Terry Peach, see classical economics as of antiquarian interest.

== See also ==
- Classical general equilibrium model
- Classical liberalism
- Constitutional economics
- Neoclassical economics
- Perspectives on capitalism
- Political economy
