= Classical general equilibrium model =

Economic model

The classical general equilibrium model aims to describe the economy by aggregating the behavior of individuals and firms. Note that the classical general equilibrium model is unrelated to classical economics, and was instead developed within neoclassical economics beginning in the late 19th century.

In the model, the individual is assumed to be the basic unit of analysis and these individuals, both workers and employers, will make choices that reflect their unique tastes, objectives, and preferences. It is assumed that individuals' wants typically exceed their ability to satisfy them (hence scarcity of goods and time). It is further assumed that individuals will eventually experience diminishing marginal utility. Finally, wages and prices are assumed to be elastic (they move up and down freely). The classical model assumes that traditional supply and demand analysis is the best approach to understanding the labor market. The functions that follow are aggregate functions that can be thought of as the summation of all the individual participants in the market.

== Labor demand ==
The consumers of the labor market are firms. The demand for labor services is a derived demand, derived from the supply and demand for the firm's products in the goods market. It is assumed that a firm's objective is to maximize profit given the demand for its products, and given the production technology that is available to it.

Some notation:

Let 
  
    
      
        p
      
    
    {\displaystyle p}
  
 be price level of commodities
Let 
  
    
      
        w
      
    
    {\displaystyle w}
  
 be nominal wage
Let 
  
    
      
        ω
      
    
    {\displaystyle \omega }
  
 be real wage (w/p)
Let 
  
    
      
        π
      
    
    {\displaystyle \pi }
  
 be profit of firms
Let 
  
    
      
        
          L
          
            D
          
        
      
    
    {\displaystyle L^{D}}
  
 be labor demand
Let 
  
    
      
        
          Y
          
            S
          
        
      
    
    {\displaystyle Y^{S}}
  
 be the firms output of commodities that it will supply to the goods market.

=== Output function ===
Let us specify this output (commodity supply) function as:

$$Y^{S}(L^{D})$$

It is an increasing concave function with respect to L^{D} because of the Diminishing Marginal Product of Labor. Note that in this simplified model, labour is the only factor of production. If we were analysing the goods market, this simplification could cause problems, but because we are looking at the labor market, this simplification is worthwhile.

=== Firms' profit function ===
Generally a firm's profit is calculated as:

profit = revenue - cost

In nominal terms the profit function is:

  
    
      
        p
        ⋅
        π
        =
        p
        ⋅
        
          Y
          
            S
          
        
        −
        w
        ⋅
        
          L
          
            D
          
        
      
    
    {\displaystyle p\cdot \pi =p\cdot Y^{S}-w\cdot L^{D}}
  

In real terms this becomes:

  
    
      
        π
        =
        
          Y
          
            S
          
        
        −
        
          
            w
            p
          
        
        ⋅
        
          L
          
            D
          
        
        =
        
          Y
          
            S
          
        
        −
        ω
        ⋅
        
          L
          
            D
          
        
      
    
    {\displaystyle \pi =Y^{S}-{\frac {w}{p}}\cdot L^{D}=Y^{S}-\omega \cdot L^{D}}
  

=== Firms' optimal (profit maximizing) condition ===
In an attempt to achieve an optimal situation, firms can maximize profits with this Maximized profit function:

  
    
      
        
          
            
              d
              
                Y
                
                  S
                
              
              (
              
                L
                
                  D
                
              
              )
            
            
              d
              
                L
                
                  D
                
              
            
          
        
        =
        ω
      
    
    {\displaystyle {\frac {dY^{S}(L^{D})}{dL^{D}}}=\omega }
  

When functions are given, Labor Demand (L^{D}) can be derived from this equation.

== Labour supply ==
The suppliers of the labor market are households. A household can be thought of as the summation of all the individuals within the household. Each household offers an amount of labour services to the market. The supply of labour can be thought of as the summation of the labour services offered by all the households. The amount of service that each household offers depends on the consumption requirements of the household, and the individuals relative preference for consumption verses free time.

Some notation:

Let U be total utility
Let YD be commodity demand (consumption)
Let LS be labor supply (hours worked)
Let D(LS) be disutility from working, an increasing convex function with respect to LS.

=== Households' consumption constraint ===
Consumption constraint = profit income + wage income

  
    
      
        
          Y
          
            D
          
        
        =
        π
        +
        ω
        ⋅
        
          L
          
            S
          
        
      
    
    {\displaystyle Y^{D}=\pi +\omega \cdot L^{S}}
  

=== Households' utility function ===
total utility = utility from consumption - disutility from work
$U = Y^{D} - D(L^{S})$
substitute consumption:
$U = \pi + \omega \cdot L^{S} - D(L^{S})$

=== Households' optimal condition ===
Maximized utility function:
$\frac{dD(L^{S})}{dL^{S}} = \omega$
When functions are given, Labor Supply (L^{S}) can be derived from this equation.

== Aggregate demand ==
Y = C + I + G whereby Y is output, C is consumption, I is investment and G is government spending

== Monetary market ==
MV=PY(Fisher's Equation of Exchange)
