= Jacob Hollander =

American economist

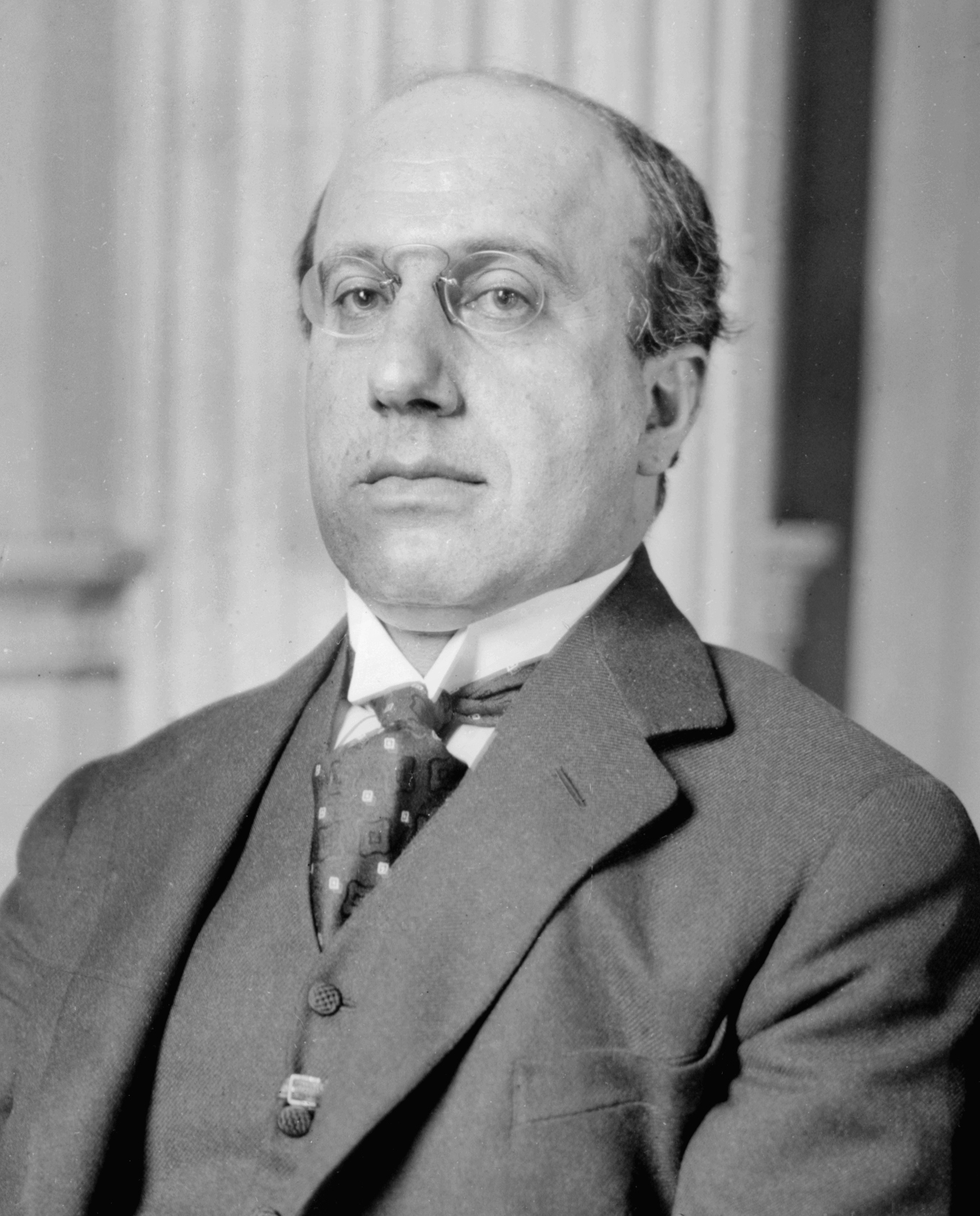
Jacob Hollander in 1915

Jacob Harry Hollander (1871–1940) was an American economist.

== Biography ==
Hollander was born in Baltimore, Maryland. He graduated from Johns Hopkins University with a BA in 1891, and a PhD in 1894. He became associate professor of finance there. In 1900, he became assistant professor of political economy, becoming full professor in 1904. He was appointed secretary to the Bimetallic Commission of 1897. US President McKinley named him Treasurer of the island of Puerto Rico in 1900. He resigned in 1901 after introducing a tax system. He was special commissioner to investigate financial conditions in San Domingo and until 1908 was financial advisor of the Dominican Republic. He also was an official arbitrator in various labour disputes. He was President of the American Economic Association in 1921.

== Works ==
His contributions to Ricardo scholarship are considerable. He edited the Letters of David Ricardo to J. R. McCulloch (1895) and (together with James Bonar) Letters to Hutches Trower and others (1899). He also initiated a famous series of Reprints of Economic Tracts in 1903.

Major publications:

- The Cincinnati Southern Railway: A Study in Municipal Activity (1894)
- The Financial History of Baltimore (1899)
- Studies in State Taxation (1900)
- Report on the Debt of Santo Domingo (1906)
- David Ricardo: A Centenary Estimate (1911)
- The Abolition of Poverty (1914)
- War Borrowing (1919)
- Economic Liberation (1925)
- Want and Plenty (1932)
