= Paolo Sylos Labini =

Italian economist

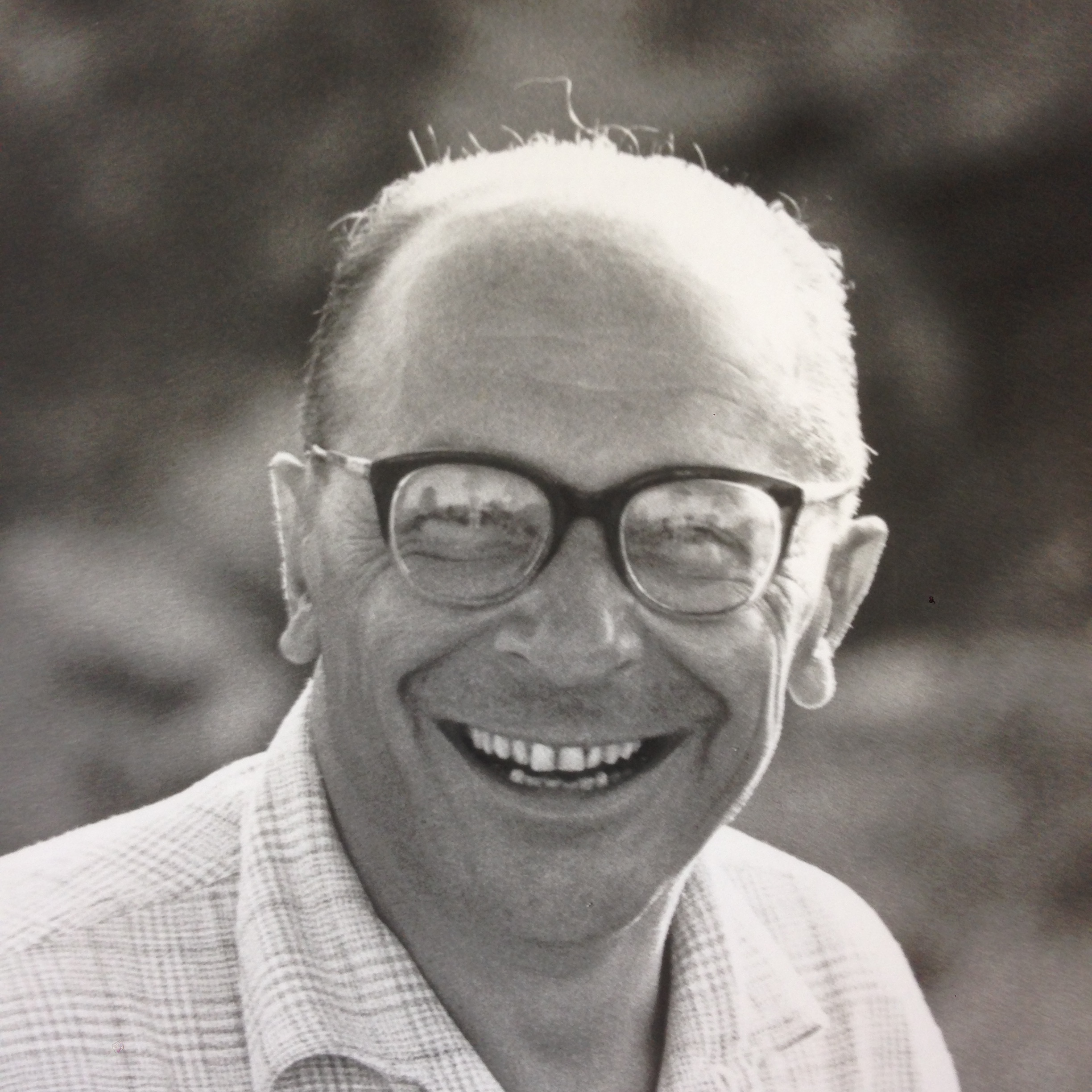
- Photograph of Labini
- Born: 30 October 1920; Rome, Kingdom of Italy
- Died: 7 December 2005 (aged 85); Rome, Italy

Academic background
- Education: Sapienza
- Influences: Joseph Schumpeter, Adam Smith

Academic work
- Discipline: Economics
- Notable ideas: Oligopoly

Paolo Sylos Labini (30 October 1920 – 7 December 2005) was an Italian economist and political advisor in post-World War II Italy. He was a professor at the Sapienza University of Rome and member of the Accademia Nazionale dei Lincei. His theoretical contributions covered oligopoly, the relation between innovation and market structure, inflation, and socioeconomic evolution. His work often contained a strong historical dimension, in common with Classical economics.

== Life ==
Paolo Sylos Labini was born in Rome, to an Apulia family, on 30 October 1920. He graduated from Sapienza University of Rome in the Faculty of Law in July 1942 with a thesis on the economic consequences of innovations. His advisor was Guglielmo Masci, then Giuseppe Ugo Papi following Masci's death in 1941. Graduating during World War II, Sylos Labini was called up for conscription and assigned to Civita Castellana, then Florence. This ended following the Badoglio Proclamation, after which he joined the Italian resistance movement. He found employment at the library of the Ministry of Agriculture, where he had also worked before the war. He later became an assistant for Alberto Breglia, a professor of political economy at Sapienza University of Rome, with whom he collaborated on several works assembled from lecture notes. He was receptive to Breglia's constant focus on development (sviluppo), which remained a central theme in his work. During this time, Sylos Labini also published on Italian economic conditions.

Sylos Labini's interest in innovation, and the sense of inadequacy of Italian economics at that time, led him to continue his studies in the United States with Joseph Schumpeter. Encouraged by Breglia (and discouraged from staying in Italy by Papi), he traveled to the United States in September 1948 as an early Fulbright scholar. He was first sent to Chicago, staying there only three months, where he met Franco Modigliani. He then traveled to Cambridge, Massachusetts to study with Schumpeter at Harvard University. Sylos Labini not only engaged with Schumpeter's theories of business cycles but, in his own words, "learned a lot from him. Mainly that economics cannot be separated from sociology, even though the two disciplines should be kept distinct." While at Harvard, he also met John Kenneth Galbraith and Gaetano Salvemini, the latter of whom he would occasionally assist in a secretarial capacity. In 1949 he traveled to Cambridge, where he was supervised by Dennis Robertson, and became friends with Piero Sraffa, Nicholas Kaldor, and Joan Robinson. Afterwards, he returned to Italy. He visited the United States again with Giuseppe Guarino in 1955 to study the American oil situation, sent by then Prime Minister Antonio Segni. That year, he began to think about themes that later appeared in Oligopoly and Technical Progress.

Sylos Labini qualified as a lecturer in political economy in 1954. In 1955, he became an assistant professor of political economy at the Faculty of Economics of the University of Sassari. He moved to the University of Catania in 1957, then to the University of Bologna in 1960, before returning to Sapienza University in October 1962, where he taught principles of political economy at the Faculty of Statistical, Demographic, and Actuarial Sciences until his retirement in 1995. Between 1971 and 1972, he worked to establish the University of Calabria with Beniamino Andreatta.

Paolo Sylos Labini married Marinella Azzone in 1960. They had two sons: Stefano (born 1961), a geologist at ENEA, and Francesco (born 1966), a physicist and Research Director of the Enrico Fermi Research Center.

He died on 7 December 2005 at the Clinica Villa Carla, in Rome.

== Economic Theory ==
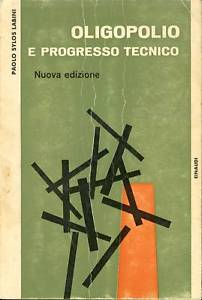
Cover of the Italian edition of "Oligopoly and technical progress"

Sylos Labini's main contribution came in 1956, with Oligopoly and Technical Progress. Oligopoly describes the general case of competitive market, whose limiting cases are perfect competition and monopoly. In agreement with Nicholas Kaldor, Sylos Labini found that oligopoly is additionally the most common situation in reality, and that its theory represented an advance in understanding imperfect competition. Sylos Labini expanded the theory's "dynamic" character (away from, for example, kinked demand curves), and formulated the resulting connections between microeconomic and macroeconomic effects. The book was published around the same time as Joe Bain's Barriers to New Competition. The two works were grouped together in an article by Franco Modigliani, which caused them to become accepted as part of mainstream theory on non-competitive market forms.

For microeconomists, the work had major implications for barriers to entry, extending the analysis of the role of technology beyond economies of scale to include, among other factors, the flexibility in price setting by oligopolistic firms. This line of inquiry led to his formalization of exclusion prices. Oligopoly also formed the basis for "Sylos' postulate": that all firms' production stays constant in response to the entry of new firms, with existing firms therefore allowing prices to fall. Despite the name, Sylos Labini considered the postulate to be an original invention of Modigliani.

Oligopoly further identified explanations for unemployment and inflation based on market structure. He identified a historical change from Schumpeter's innovator-centric business cycle, concluding that high concentration in industry had disproportionately allowed existing firms exclusive hold on new technologies, countering competitive mechanisms that would otherwise drive prices down. The reabsorption of those unemployed due to new technologies is also slowed. In addition to the new role of technology, Sylos Labini identified wage pressure, rising prices of imported raw materials like oil, and speculation as contributors to inflation. The work also began investigations into topics such as stagnation and income distribution, later developed in works such as The Forces of Economic Growth and Decline. For example, his dynamic analysis of the Great Depression produced conclusions different from the standard Monetarist or Keynesian views:

I maintain, in contraposition to the thesis of Keynes, that the Wall Street crash, which came at the end of a true frenzy of speculation and created some important preconditions for the depression, should be attributed instead to three "objective" reciprocally interacting factors: the extraordinary changes in the distribution of income, the effects of certain great innovations, and deep-rooted changes in the market structure manifest in the spread and the strengthening of oligopolies and monopolies.

Similar arguments led to his theory of an "optimum rate of profit" that emerged when considering the effect of wage increases on effective demand.

Sylos Labini's methodology did not adhere to any one school. Paul Samuelson offered, in Sylos Labini's Festschrift, "Economists around the world, from Cambridge to Cambridge and Osaka to Omaha, admire you for a lifetime of Schumpeterian innovation, Keynesian brilliance, Ricardian rigor, and Smithian realism." In particular, Sylos Labini was never comfortable limiting economics to Neoclassical equilibrium finding. His body of work therefore included titles such as Underdevelopment: A Strategy for Reform, in which he sought to identify the main, variegated drivers of inequality between the richest and poorest nations, while also describing the failure of "mainstream economics" to address such problems. He also made important policy-directed contributions, including guidelines for Italy's nascent petroleum industry in the 1950s, an econometric model of the Italian economy in 1967, and a series of works on wages, productivity, and inflation, published between 1965 and 1975, which incorporated the results of his econometric analyses.

== Civic Engagement ==
Sylos Labini maintained a lifelong commitment to improving conditions in Italy through political involvement, and held that it was in fact the goal of the economist to promote civil development. He wrote of himself, in his 1974 Saggio sulle classi sociali (Essay on Social Classes), "The author considers himself, politically, an honest reformist – honest in the sense that he not only believes in but, with his very modest means, works for reforms, especially those reforms that can help clear the ground of all those legally controllable obstacles that hinder the development of the working class."

In 1949, at age 29, he contributed to the Work Plan proposed by Giuseppe Di Vittorio, a plan for the economic and social reconstruction of Italy. He wrote articles in Piero Calamandrei's Il Ponte and Mario Pannunzio's Il Mondo on a range of economic issues. Among these was a 1954 Il Mondo article on child labor in Campania: an early example of research into the Mezzogiorno region and underdevelopment. Later work would include testimony to the Parliamentary Committee of enquiry into the Sicilian mafia in 1965, also published in l'Astrolabio, as well as the collection Problemi dell'economia siciliana, containing fieldwork-based analyses of differences between eastern and western Sicily. In 1955, at the request of Antonio Segni, he undertook a study of the petroleum industry to inform Italian law regulating oil extraction. From 1962 to 1964, he was a member of the National Commission for Economic Planning, during the first center-left government under Amintore Fanfani. With Giorgio Fuà, he presented a report arguing that planning, even before being an economic issue, was an institutional problem to be addressed with the help of jurists and scholars in political and sociological disciplines. From 1964 to 1974, he was a member of the Technical-Scientific Council of the Ministry of the Budget, where he worked on the first econometric model of the Italian economy. His public resignation in 1974 was in response to the appointment of Salvatore Lima as Under-Secretary of the Budget, and more generally corruption, the connection between the mafia and politics, and Italy's degenerating party system. He criticized the 1968 protests in a controversial article for l'Astrolabio; he later reflected, "They seemed like mad sheep, headed towards the precipice: they were creating the conditions to be exploited in the worst possible way." His widely-read Essay on Social Classes was critical of the Marxist rhetoric then in use in politics, and argued that the proletariat, rather than trending towards majority, was in fact in numerical decline. In the 1980s, he contributed in la Repubblica to discussions surrounding inflation, wage indexation, and the role of unions, contemporary with Modigliani and Ezio Tarantelli. He was a member of the Accademia Nazionale dei Lincei. In 1998, he co-signed "An economists' Manifesto on unemployment in the European Union." In his final years, he was active in various political organizations and was a vocal opponent of Silvio Berlusconi.

== Selected works ==
- Oligopoly and Technical Progress / Oligopolio e progresso tecnico (1956)
- Problemi dell'economia siciliana (1966)
- Problemi dello sviluppo economico (1970)
- Trade Unions, Inflation and Productivity / Sindacati, inflazione e produttività (1972)
- Saggio sulle classi sociali (1974)
- Il sottosviluppo e l'economia contemporanea (1983)
- The Forces of Economic Growth and Decline / Le forze dello sviluppo e del declino (1984)
- Le classi sociali negli anni '80 Roma-Bari (1986)
- Nuove tecnologie e disoccupazione (1989)
- Elementi di dinamica economica (1992)
- Economic Growth and Business Cycles: Prices and the Process of Cyclical Development / Progresso tecnico e sviluppo ciclico (1993)
- Underdevelopment: A Strategy for Reform / Sottosviluppo. una strategia di riforme (2000)
- Ahi serva Italia: Un appello ai miei concittadini (2006)
