= Ian Steedman =

British economist

Ian Steedman (born 1941, London) is a British economist. He was for many years a professor of economics at the University of Manchester before moving down the road to Manchester Metropolitan University. He retired from there at the end of 2006, but was appointed as an emeritus professor.

== Works ==
Steedman has been recognised as one of the leading Neo-Ricardian economic theorists with work in the areas overlapping with those of Marx, Sraffa, Marshall, Jevons and Wicksteed. He has also made contributions to economic theory on time, international trade, capital theory and growth and distribution.

He is also a senior research fellow at the William Temple Foundation, and his work now includes the study of "happiness" and its relation to welfare economics. In the Spring of 1993, Steedman was a Fellow at the Swedish Collegium for Advanced Study in Uppsala, Sweden.

Ian Steedman is on the editorial board of The European Journal of the History of Economic Thought.

=== Festschrift ===
Vint J., Metcalfe J.S., Kurz H.D., Salvadori N., and Samuelson P.A. (2009). Economic theory and economic thought: Essays in honour of Ian Steedman. Routledge Taylor & Francis Group.

=== Books ===
- Ian Steedman (1977). Marx after Sraffa. London: NLB. ISBN 0902308-49-1.
- Trade Amongst Growing Economies, 1979
- Ian Steedman; Paul Sweezy, eds. (1981). The Value Controversy. London: New Left Books. ISBN 978-0860917380.
- From Exploitation to Altruism. Polity Press, Cambridge, 1989.
- Socialism and Marginalism in Economics, 1870–1930, Routledge, 1995. (as Editor and Contributor)
- Consumption takes Time. Implications for Economic Theory, Routledge, London, 2001.

=== Chapters in books ===
- Ian Steedman (1981). "Ricardo, Marx, Sraffa". In Ian Steedman; Paul Sweezy (eds.). The Value Controversy. London: New Left Books. pp. 11–19. ISBN 978-0860917380.
- Steedman, Ian (1982), "Marx on Ricardo", in Bradley, Ian C.; Howard, Michael C. (eds.), Classical and Marxian political economy: essays in honour of Ronald L. Meek, London: Macmillan, pp. 115–156, ISBN 9780333321997.

=== Papers ===
- Ian Steedman (Mar 1975). "Positive Profits with negative Surplus value". The Economic Journal. 85 (337): 114–123. doi:10.2307/2230532. JSTOR 2230532.
- Economic Theory and Intrinsically Non-Autonomous Preferences and Beliefs. Quaderni Fondazione Feltrinelli. (Proceedings of the Seminar in Economic Methodology), No. 7/8, 1980.
- (with U. Krause) Goethe's Faust, Arrow's possibility theorem and the individual decision taker. In J. Elster (ed.), The Multiple Self, C.U.P., 1986.
- Rationality, economic man and altruism in Philip H. Wicksteed's Common Sense of Political Economy. (In) Truth, Liberty, Religion: Essays celebrating two hundred years of Manchester College, Oxford, (ed. B.A. Smith), 1986.
- Trade interest versus class interest. Economia Politica vol. 3, 1986.
- The Economic Journal and Socialism, 1890 to 1920, (in) J.D. Hey and D. Winch (eds.), A Century of Economics, Oxford, Basil Blackwell, 1990.
- P.H. Wicksteed on Das Kapital, Volume I, (in) D. Moggridge (ed.), Perspectives on the History of Economic Thought, Volume III, Classicals, Marxians and Neo-classicals, Edward Elgar, Aldershot 1990.
- 'Worker versus worker', (in) S. Kozyr-Kowalski and A. Przestalski (eds.), On Social Differentiation. A Contribution to the Critique of Marxist Ideology, Adam Mickiewicz University Press, Poznan, 1992.
- John Carruthers: A Victorian market socialist, European Journal for the History of Economic Thought, 1994.
- P.H. Wicksteed: Economist and Prophet, (in) H.G. Brennan and A.M.C. Waterman (eds.), Economics and Religion; Are they distinct?, Kluwer Academic Publishing, 1994.
- Welfare Economics and Robinson Crusoe the Producer, Metroeconomica, 2000, 51(2), 151–167.
- On some concepts of rationality in economics, in P. E. Earl & S. F. Frowen (eds) Economics as an Art of Thought: Essays in memory of G.L.S. Shackle, 2000, London, Routledge, 101–123.
- British economists and philosophers on Marx's value theory, 1920–1925. Journal of the History of Economic Thought, 2004.
- Philip Henry Wicksteed, entry in the new Oxford Dictionary of National Biography, 2004.
- On not traducing economics. (In) J. Atherton and H. Skinner (eds.), Through the Eye of a Needle, Epworth Press, 2007
