= Pierangelo Garegnani =

Italian economist (1930–2011)

- Born: 9 August 1930; Milan, Italy
- Died: 14 October 2011 (aged 81); Lavagna, Italy

Academic background
- Education: University of Pavia; University of Cambridge
- Influences: Piero Sraffa

Academic work
- Discipline: Economics
- School or tradition: Neo-Ricardian school
- Institutions: University of Rome III
- Website: Information at IDEAS / RePEc

Pierangelo Garegnani (9 August 1930 – 14 October 2011) was an Italian economist and professor of the University of Rome III. He was the director of the Fondazione Centro Piero Sraffa di Studi e Documenti at the Federico Caffè School of Economics, and also the literary executor of the works, documents and papers left by the Italian economist Piero Sraffa to the University of Cambridge's Wren Library.

Professor Garegnani was one of the leading theoretical critics of neoclassical economics. He published several books and articles concerning the classical economic theory, from Ricardo to Sraffa, as an alternative theoretical foundation to analyse the capitalist economy. An account of his contributions was published by the Royal Economic Society. During the 1980s, Garegnani worked as a visiting professor at The New School.

== Biography ==
After graduating with a degree in political science from the University of Pavia as a student of the Ghislieri College in 1953, he was a student of Maurice Dobb and Piero Sraffa at Trinity College, Cambridge. In 1959, he received a Ph.D. in Political Economy from the University of Cambridge.

He taught at the University of Sassari (1962–66), University of Pavia (1966–69), University of Florence (1969–74), at the Sapienza University of Rome (1974–92) and the Roma Tre University (1992–2002), where he directed the "Piero Sraffa" Research and Documentation Center and was professor emeritus (2002–2011). He also taught at the University of Cambridge (1975–77) and at the New School University of New York (1987–1990).

He was the literary executor of Piero Sraffa, whose manuscripts, donated by Sraffa himself to the University of Cambridge, are preserved at Trinity College, Cambridge.

In the 1960s Garegnani was, together with Luigi Pasinetti, among the leading figures in the capital controversy, which saw him opposed to the positions of Paul Samuelson and Robert Solow. He made fundamental contributions to the revival of the theoretical approach that was characteristic of the classical economists and Marx along the lines indicated by Sraffa in Production of Commodities by means of Commodities and to the re-proposition of the Keynesian principle of effective demand.

== Works ==
A comprehensive list of Garegnani's works is provided in Giancarlo de Vivo [2012].
