= On the Principles of Political Economy and Taxation =

1817 book by David Ricardo

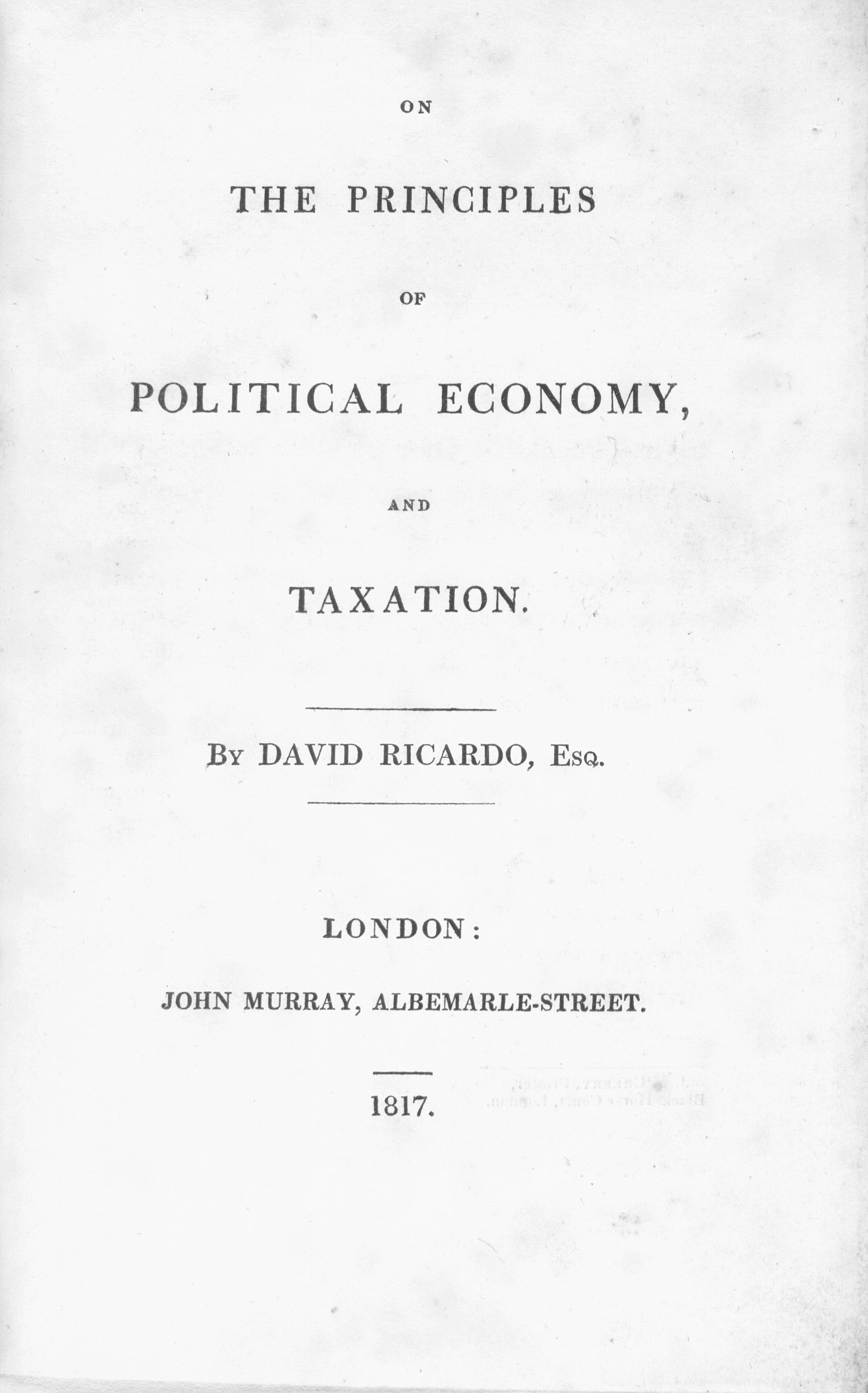
- Title page from the first edition
- Author: David Ricardo
- Language: English
- Subject: Economics
- Publisher: John Murray
- Publication date: 1817
- Publication place: England
- Text: On the Principles of Political Economy and Taxation at Wikisource

On the Principles of Political Economy and Taxation is a book by David Ricardo on economics, first published 19 April 1817. The book concludes that land rent grows as population increases. It also presents the theory of comparative advantage, the theory that free trade between two or more countries can be mutually beneficial, even when one country has an absolute advantage over the other countries in all areas of production.

During the Napoleonic Wars, Ricardo grew weary of the Corn Laws, a tax imposed on wheat by the British that made it impossible to import wheat from the rest of Europe. Ricardo, despite his wealth, supported those who could no longer afford grains and bread once the price floor was in effect to support farmers. In his argument for what is now free trade, Ricardo highlights the idea that if a country can get a good from another country at a lower cost, it would behoove a country to source that item from the cheaper producing country than to produce the good locally. "To produce the wine in Portugal, might require only the labour of 80 men for one year, and to produce the cloth in the same country, might require the labour of 90 men for the same time. It would therefore be advantageous for her to export wine in exchange for cloth." Ricardo's theory demonstrates that a country, when choosing between two goods to produce and trade, could still achieve an advantage by focusing on the good requiring fewer resources to produce, even if the country does not have an absolute advantage in that good. This allows countries with an absolute advantage in multiple goods, or with no absolute advantage at all, to still benefit from international trade.

Ricardo claims in the preface that Turgot, James Steuart, Adam Smith, Jean-Baptiste Say, Sismondi, and others had not written enough "satisfactory information" on the topics of rent, profit, and wages. Principles of Political Economy is Ricardo's effort to fill that gap in the literature. Regardless of whether the book achieved that goal, it secured, according to Ronald Max Hartwell, Ricardo's position among the great classical economists Adam Smith, Thomas Malthus, John Stuart Mill, Karl Marx, and Henry George, the last which updated Ricardo's theory of rent to urban economies in his 1879 work Progress and Poverty.

In his book Adam's Fallacy: A Guide to Economic Theology, economist Duncan K. Foley highlights that in the Principles Ricardo criticizes Adam Smith's treatment of the theory of value and distribution for circular reasoning, in particular as far as concerns rent, and that Ricardo considers the labour theory of value, properly understood, a more logically sound basis for political economic reasoning.

Foley also discusses the chapter On Machinery, which Ricardo included in his third and final (1821) version of Principles. Here Ricardo famously analysed the impact of the adoption of machinery on the different classes of society, revising his earlier view that mechanization could be expected to be of benefit to each of the classes of the society. The increase in productivity due to mechanization lowers the production costs and thus also the real prices of commodities. Whereas the landowning class and capitalists benefit from the lower prices, workers in contrast do not reap such benefit from the lower prices if capitalists reduce the wage fund in order to finance the expensive machinery, causing technological unemployment among workers. In this case, Ricardo points out, wages are forced down by competition among workers, and the introduction of new machines can lead to an overall decline in the well-being of the working class.
