= Alessandro Roncaglia =

Italian economist

- Born: 17 June 1947 (age 79); Rome
- Website: Information at IDEAS / RePEc

Alessandro Roncaglia (born 17 June 1947) is an Italian economist. He was professor of economics at the Sapienza University of Rome from 1981 to 2017.

== Awards and honors ==
In 2002 the Italian edition of his The wealth of ideas, later published in an expanded edition in English, has won the Jerome Blanqui Award of the European Society for the History of Economic Thought.

In 2018 appeared Classical Economics Today: Essays in Honor of Alessandro Roncaglia, edited by Marcella Corsi, J.A. Kregel and Carlo D'Ippoliti.

== Bibliography ==
Among the publications of Alessandro Roncaglia are:

- Roncaglia, Alessandro (1977). Petty: la nascita dell' economia politica (in Italian). Milano: Etas libra. OCLC 801203261;
  translated in Spanish as:
  —— (1980). Petty: El nacimiento de la economía política (in Spanish). Madrid: Pirámide. OCLC 1024339833;
  translated in English as:
  —— (1985). Petty. The Origins of Political Economy. Translated by Isabella Cherubini. Cardiff etc: University College Cardiff Press. ISBN 0 906449 91 X.OCLC 924687832
- —— (2000). Piero Sraffa: his life, thought, and cultural heritage. New York: Routledge. OCLC 49569928.
- —— (2005). The wealth of ideas: a history of economic thought. Cambridge: Cambridge University Press. doi:10.1017/CBO9780511492341. OCLC 62708024. (several reprints)
