= David Ricardo =

British economist and politician (1772–1823)

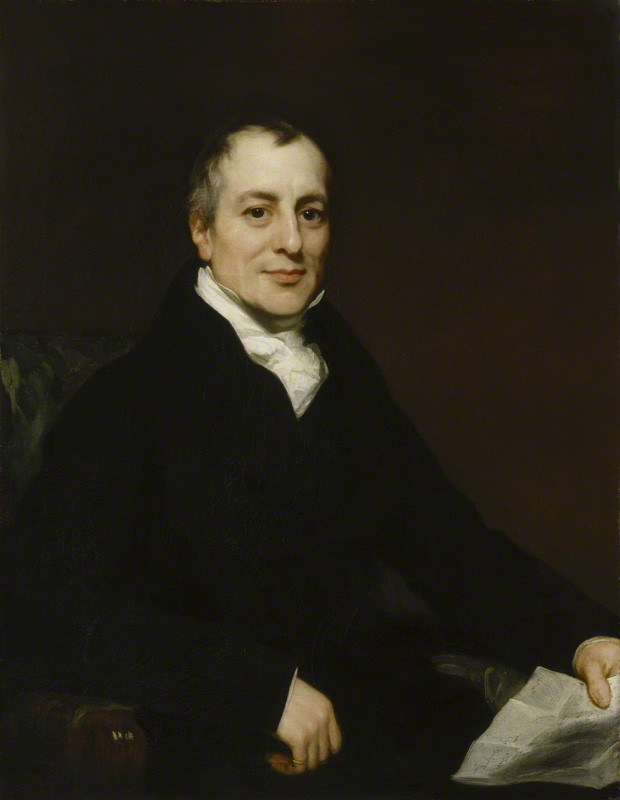
- Portrait by Thomas Phillips, c. 1821

Member of Parliament for Portarlington
- In office 20 February 1819 – 11 September 1823
- Preceded by: Richard Sharp
- Succeeded by: James Farquhar

Personal details
- Born: 18 April 1772 London, England
- Died: 11 September 1823 (aged 51) Gatcombe Park, Gloucestershire, England
- Party: Whig
- Children: 8, including Osman and David the Younger
- Profession: Economist; politician

Academic background
- Influences: Bentham · Smith

Academic work
- School or tradition: Classical economics
- Notable ideas: Ricardian equivalence, labour theory of value, comparative advantage, law of diminishing returns, Ricardian economics (later interpretations: Ricardian socialism and Neo-Ricardian economics), Economic rent

David Ricardo (18 April 1772 – 11 September 1823) was a British economist and politician. He is recognized as one of the most influential classical economists, alongside figures such as Thomas Malthus, Adam Smith and James Mill.

Ricardo was born in London as the third surviving child of a successful stockbroker and his wife. He came from a Sephardic Jewish family of Portuguese origin. At 21, he eloped with a Quaker and converted to Unitarianism, causing estrangement from his family. He made his fortune financing government borrowing and later retired to an estate in Gloucestershire. Ricardo served as High Sheriff of Gloucestershire and bought a seat in Parliament as an earnest reformer. He was friends with prominent figures like James Mill, Jeremy Bentham, and Thomas Malthus, engaging in debates over various topics. Ricardo was also a member of The Geological Society, and his youngest sister was an author.

As MP for Portarlington, Ricardo advocated for liberal political movements and reforms, including free trade, parliamentary reform, and criminal law reform. He believed free trade increased the well-being of people by making goods more affordable. Ricardo notably opposed the Corn Laws, which he saw as barriers to economic growth. His friend John Louis Mallett described Ricardo's conviction in his beliefs, though he expressed doubts about Ricardo's disregard for experience and practice. Ricardo died at 51 from an ear infection that led to septicaemia (sepsis). He left behind a considerable fortune and a lasting legacy, with his free trade views eventually becoming public policy in Britain.

Ricardo wrote his first economics article at age 37, advocating for a reduction in the note-issuing of the Bank of England. He was also an abolitionist and believed in the autonomy of a central bank as the issuer of money. Ricardo worked on fixing issues in Adam Smith's labour theory of value, stating that the value of a commodity depends on the labour necessary for its production. He contributed to the development of theories of rent, wages, and profits, defining rent as the difference between the produce obtained by employing equal quantities of capital and labour. Ricardo's Theory of Profit posited that as real wages increase, real profits decrease due to the revenue split between profits and wages.

Ricardian theory of international trade challenges the mercantilist concept of accumulating gold or silver by promoting industry specialization and free trade. Ricardo introduced the concept of "comparative advantage", suggesting that nations should concentrate resources only in industries where they have the greatest efficiency of production relative to their own alternative uses of resources. He argued that international trade is always beneficial, even if one country is more competitive in every area than its trading counterpart. Ricardo opposed protectionism for national economies and was concerned about the short-term impact of technological change on labour.

== Early life ==
Born in London, England, Ricardo was the third surviving of the 17 children of successful stockbroker Abraham Israel Ricardo (1733?–1812) and Abigail (1753–1801), daughter of Abraham Delvalle (also "del Valle"), of a respectable Sephardic Jewish family that had been settled in England for three generations as "small but prosperous" tobacco and snuff merchants, and had obtained British citizenship. Abigail's sister, Rebecca, was wife of the engraver Wilson Lowry, and mother of the engraver Joseph Wilson Lowry and the geologist, mineralogist, and author Delvalle Lowry. The Ricardo family were Sephardic Jews of Portuguese origin who had recently relocated from the Dutch Republic. Ricardo began working with his father at the age of 14. At the age of 21, Ricardo eloped with a Quaker, Priscilla Anne Wilkinson, and against his father's wishes, converted to Unitarianism. This religious difference resulted in estrangement from his family, and he was led to adopt a position of independence. His father disowned him and his mother apparently never spoke to him again.

Following this estrangement he went into business for himself with the support of Lubbocks and Forster, an eminent banking house. He made the bulk of his fortune by profitably financing Government borrowing.

== Parliamentary record ==
As MP for Portarlington, Ricardo voted with the opposition in support of liberal political movements in Naples and Sicily, and for inquiry into the administration of justice in Tobago. He voted for repeal of the Blasphemous and Seditious Libels Act; then for inquiry into the Peterloo Massacre; and, in 1821, for abolition of the death penalty for forgery.

He supported free trade. In 1821 he voted against renewal of the sugar duties, and objected to the higher duty on East Indian as opposed to West Indian produce. He opposed the timber duties. He voted silently for parliamentary reform and in 1822 spoke in its favour at the Westminster anniversary reform dinner; and again voted for criminal law reform.

Ricardo believed that increasing imports and free trade boosted the well-being of mankind by increasing the amount of goods cheaply available for subsistence and consumption. He was said to have "possessed an extraordinary quickness in perceiving in the turns of the market any accidental difference which might arise between the relative price of different stocks". He grew his wealth dealing in securities during the Revolutionary and Napoleonic Wars.

As the Napoleonic Wars waged on, Ricardo developed a disdain for the Corn Laws imposed by the British to encourage exports. Notably, government intervention in the grain trade can be traced as far back as the 1400s; and thereafter trade was controlled, regulated, and taxed. Meanwhile, England developed a capitalist economy involving workers and landlords generating and consuming incomes and capital accumulations that depended entirely on capitalists' profits, and these key economic elements were under perpetual pressure during the eighteenth and early nineteenth centuries.

Political reform was needed as agricultural output was struggling to keep pace with population growth. The Corn Laws imposed barriers to imports that increased subsistence/consumption costs and triggered demand for higher wages. Higher wages reduced profits for agricultural producers, and had the immediate effects of reducing capital investments and slowing the growth of a nation's economy. Rising rents, attributed by Ricardo to the Corn Laws, came at the expense of the economic profits of nations. For David Ricardo, free trade was ever the answer; he envisioned Britain as importing agriculture products in exchange for exporting manufactured goods. Eventually, after his death, the interventionist laws were repealed, and his free trade views became public policy in Britain.

Of David Ricardo, his friend John Louis Mallett commented: " ... he meets you upon every subject that he has studied with a mind made up, and opinions in the nature of mathematical truths. He spoke of parliamentary reform and ballot as a man who would bring such things about, and destroy the existing system tomorrow, if it were in his power, and without the slightest doubt on the result ... It is this very quality of the man's mind, his entire disregard of experience and practice, which makes me doubtful of his opinions on political economy."

== Later life ==
A popular story states that he made his fortune as a result of speculation on the outcome of the Battle of Waterloo: in Ricardo's obituary, published on 14 September 1823,The Sunday Times reported that during the battle Ricardo "netted upwards of a million sterling", a huge sum at the time, and this was later popularised by the economist Paul Samuelson. In reality, Ricardo was already very rich, and in June 1815, sold his latest government stock before the result of the battle was known in London, missing half of the rise.

He subsequently purchased Gatcombe Park, an estate in Gloucestershire, and retired to the country. He was appointed High Sheriff of Gloucestershire for 1818–19. In August 1818 he bought Lord Portarlington's seat in Parliament for £4,000, as part of the terms of a loan of £25,000. His record in Parliament was that of an earnest reformer. He held the seat until his death five years later.

== Personal life and death ==
He and his wife Priscilla had eight children together including Osman Ricardo (1795–1881, MP for Worcester 1847–1865), David Ricardo (1803–1864, MP for Stroud 1832–1833) and Mortimer Ricardo, who served as an officer in the Life Guards and was a deputy lieutenant for Oxfordshire.

Ricardo was a close friend of James Mill. Other notable friends included Jeremy Bentham and Thomas Malthus, with whom Ricardo had a considerable debate (in correspondence) over such things as the role of landowners in a society. He also was a member of Malthus' Political Economy Club, and a member of the King of Clubs. He was one of the original members of The Geological Society. His youngest sister was author Sarah Ricardo-Porter (e.g., Conversations in Arithmetic).Lat

Ten years after retiring and four years after entering Parliament, Ricardo died at 51 from an infection of the middle ear that spread into his brain and induced septicaemia. He is buried in an ornate grave in the churchyard of Saint Nicholas in Hardenhuish, now a suburb of Chippenham, Wiltshire. At the time of his death, his assets were estimated at £675,000–£775,000.

== Ideas ==
Ricardo wrote his first economics article at 37, firstly in The Morning Chronicle advocating reduction in the note-issuing of the Bank of England and then publishing The High Price of Bullion, a Proof of the Depreciation of Bank Notes in 1810.

He was also an abolitionist, speaking at a meeting of the Court of the East India Company in March 1823, where he said he regarded slavery as a stain on the character of the nation.

=== Banking ===
Adam Smith argued that free commercial banking, such as the banking system in Scotland which had no central bank when Wealth of Nations was written in 1776, was favourable to economic growth. Writing just a few decades later, Ricardo argued for a central bank, a cause that was taken up by his students, including John Stuart Mill, who was known to favour the laissez-faire policies in every place but banking.

Ricardo wrote the Plan for the Establishment of a National Bank (published posthumously in 1824), which argued for the autonomy of the central bank as the issuer of money.

Ricardo proposed that a ratio of gold and Treasury bills, and a fixed claim (asset) against the government, would secure the central bank's liquidity:

The public, or the Government on behalf of the public, is indebted to the Bank in a sum of money larger than the whole amount of Bank notes in circulation; for the Government not only owes the Bank fifteen million, its original capital, which is lent at 3 per cent. interest, but also many more millions which are advanced on Exchequer bills, on half-pay and pension annuities, and on other securities. It is evident, therefore, that if the Government itself were to be the sole issuer of paper money instead of borrowing it of the Bank, the only difference would be with respect to the interest: the Bank would no longer receive interest and the Government would no longer pay it; but all other classes in the community would be exactly in the same position in which they now stand.

Ricardo was a man of many trades, economically and financially speaking. Ricardo was able to recognize and identify the problem presented through banking within regulations and debauched standards of approval at certain times. Ricardo knew that banks in rural areas as well as the Bank of England had increased note lending and overall lending in 1810. Through this, Ricardo proved subsequent changes in price level through the market was also affected and thus new regulations needed to be made available. Furthermore, Ricardo was able to understand and distinguish the socioeconomic makeup that created and established parameters around different classes within the economy. Ricardo advocated for the productive powers of labour to be held in high concern as the most influential of devices that played a role in the progression of the American Economy along with others. In addition, Ricardo made notable advancements in the concept build involving reactions in the open market when considering banking altercations, stock investments, or other considerable impacting events. Ricardo wanted to establish a firm ground between the bank and the control over monetary policy because there was power within the banking system that Ricardo believed needed to be considered carefully. In 1816, Ricardo said "In the present state of the law, they have the power, without any control whatever, of increasing or reducing the circulation in any degree they may think proper: a power which should neither be entrusted to the State itself, nor to anybody in it; as there can be no security for the uniformity in the value of the currency, when its augmentation or diminution depends solely on the will of the issuers." Ricardo felt the circulation of money and the decision behind how much is available at any time should not be entrusted to either the State, or any individual. Ricardo argued for the most even distribution possible with the highest control readily available.

=== Value theory ===
David Ricardo worked to fix the issues he felt were most concerning with Adam Smith's labour theory of value. Both men worked with the assumption that land, labour, and capital were the three basic factors of production. However, Smith narrowed in on labour as the determinant of value. Ricardo believes that with production having three factors it is impossible for only one of them to determine value on its own. Ricardo illustrates his point by adapting Smith's deer-beaver analogy to show that even when labour is the only factor of production the hardship and tools of the labour will drive a wedge in the relative value of the good. Due to Ricardo's apparent criticisms of the labour theory of value, in 1958 George Stigler called his theory a "93% labor theory of value". However, French economist Huguette Biaujeaud observed as early as 1934 that the passage on which Stigler's argument depends appeared only in the third edition of Principles; she concluded that "the labor theory of value and the cost of production theory of value coexisted parallel to one another in Ricardo's thought" and that "the true interest of the Ricardian system lies in the duality of these two theories".

Ricardo's most famous work is his Principles of Political Economy and Taxation (1817). He advanced a labour theory of value:

The value of a commodity, or the quantity of any other commodity for which it will exchange, depends on the relative quantity of labour which is necessary for its production, and not on the greater or less compensation which is paid for that labour.

Ricardo's note to Section VI:

Mr. Malthus appears to think that it is a part of my doctrine, that the cost and value of a thing be the same;—it is, if he means by cost, "cost of production" including profit.

=== Rent ===
Ricardo contributed to the development of theories of rent, wages, and profits. He defined rent as "the difference between the produce obtained by the employment of two equal quantities of capital and labour." Ricardo believed that the process of economic development, which increased land use and eventually led to the cultivation of poorer land, principally benefited landowners. According to Ricardo, such premium over "real social value" that is reaped due to ownership constitutes value to an individual but is at best a paper monetary return to "society". The portion of such purely individual benefit that accrues to scarce resources Ricardo labels "rent".

In particular, Ricardo postulates that rent is a result of increased populations which results in assets growing scarce and in some cases diminished returns of which were once abundant. Ricardo breaks down this premise by first supposing there are three fields of land – No. 1, 2, 3, – to yield corn, with an equal employment of capital and labour. Initially land No. 1 is cultivated and is very productive as measured through the abundant surplus. Over time this abundant surplus becomes diminished as the result of an increase in population, which subsequently creates an increased demand for food. The less desired land, No. 2, must now be cultivated and eventually so must land No. 3 and so on and so forth. For Ricardo each new cultivated results in diminished surplus as the quality of land fails to yield the equal of that before it. In light of such diminishing surplus landowners see opportunities to charge rent as a means to compensate for the loss of returns on output.

=== Model-making ===
According to sociologist of quantification Mary S. Morgan David Ricardo can be considered one of the pioneers in economic modelling. In studying rents, for example, Ricardo experiments numerically to determine the relative share of profit accruing to land owner, capital holder and laborers through what Morgan calls 'numerical model farming'. In his numerical and verbal accounts Ricardo tests different improvements in capital, technology or labour to increase the yield of a farm, paralleling actual experiments run by his contemporaries such as "Turnip" Townshend.

=== Ricardo's theories of wages and profits ===
In his Theory of Profit, Ricardo stated that as real wages increase, real profits decrease because the revenue from the sale of manufactured goods is split between profits and wages. He said in his Essay on Profits, "Profits depend on high or low wages, wages on the price of necessaries, and the price of necessaries chiefly on the price of food."

== Ricardian theory of international trade ==
Between 1500 and 1750 most economists advocated mercantilism, which promoted the idea of international trade for the purpose of earning bullion by running a trade surplus with other countries. Ricardo challenged the idea that the purpose of trade was merely to accumulate gold or silver. With "comparative advantage" Ricardo argued in favour of industry specialisation and free trade. He suggested that industry specialization combined with free international trade always produces positive results. This theory expanded on the concept of absolute advantage.

Ricardo suggested that there is mutual national benefit from trade even if one country is more competitive in every area than its trading counterpart and that a nation should concentrate resources only in industries where it has a comparative advantage, that is in those industries in which it has the greatest efficiency of production relative to its own alternative uses of resources, rather than industries where it holds a competitive edge compared to rival nations. Ricardo suggested that national industries which were, in fact, mildly profitable and marginally internationally competitive should be jettisoned in favour of the industries that made the best use of limited resources—the assumption being that subsequent economic growth due to better resource use would more than offset any short-run economic dislocation which would result from closing mildly profitable and marginally competitive national industries.

Ricardo attempted to prove theoretically that international trade is always beneficial. Paul Samuelson called the numbers used in Ricardo's example dealing with trade between England and Portugal the "four magic numbers". "In spite of the fact that the Portuguese could produce both cloth and wine with less amount of labour, Ricardo suggested that both countries would benefit from trade with each other".

As for recent extensions of Ricardian models, see Ricardian trade theory extensions.

=== Comparative advantage ===
Ricardo's theory of international trade was reformulated by John Stuart Mill in 1844. The term "comparative advantage" was introduced by J.S. Mill and his contemporaries.

John Stuart Mill started a neoclassical turn of international trade theory, i.e. his formulation was inherited by Alfred Marshall and others, and has both contributed to the resurrection of the anti-Ricardian concept of law of supply and demand, and induced the arrival of neoclassical theory of value.

=== New interpretation ===
Ricardo's four magic numbers have long been interpreted as comparison of two ratios of labour (or other input in fixed supply) coefficients. This interpretation is now considered as overly simplistic by modern economists. The point was rediscovered by Roy J. Ruffin in 2002 and re-examined and explained in detail in Andrea Maneschi in 2004. The more flexible approach is now known as the new interpretation, despite having been previously mentioned by Piero Sraffa in 1930 and by Kenzo Yukizawa in 1974. The new interpretation affords a totally new reading of Ricardo's Principles of Political Economy and Taxation with regards to trade theory, although it does not change the mathematics of optimal resource allocation.

=== Protectionism ===
Like Adam Smith, Ricardo was an opponent of protectionism for national economies, especially for agriculture. He believed that the British "Corn Laws"—imposing tariffs on agricultural products—ensured that less-productive domestic land would be cultivated and rents would be driven up (Case & Fair 1999, pp. 812, 813). Thus, profits would be directed toward landlords and away from the emerging industrial capitalists. Ricardo believed landlords tended to squander their wealth on luxuries, rather than invest. He believed the Corn Laws were leading to the stagnation of the British economy. In 1846, his nephew John Lewis Ricardo, MP for Stoke-upon-Trent, advocated free trade and the repeal of the Corn Laws.

Modern empirical analysis of the Corn Laws yields mixed results. Parliament repealed the Corn Laws in 1846.

=== Technological change ===
Ricardo was concerned about the impact of technological change on labour in the short-term. In 1821, he wrote that he had become "convinced that the substitution of machinery for human labour, is often very injurious to the interests of the class of labourers", and that "the opinion entertained by the labouring class, that the employment of machinery is frequently detrimental to their interests, is not founded on prejudice and error, but is conformable to the correct principles of political economy." Ricardo's idea of technological change is now formulated in a modern form.

=== Criticism of the Ricardian theory of trade ===
Ricardo himself was the first to recognize that comparative advantage is a domain-specific theory, meaning that it applies only when certain conditions are met. Ricardo noted that the theory applies only in situations where capital is immobile. Regarding his famous example, he wrote:

it would undoubtedly be advantageous to the capitalists [and consumers] of England ... [that] the wine and cloth should both be made in Portugal [and that] the capital and labour of England employed in making cloth should be removed to Portugal for that purpose.

Ricardo recognized that applying his theory in situations where capital was mobile would result in offshoring, and thereby economic decline and job loss. To correct for this, he argued that (i) "most men of property [will be] satisfied with a low rate of profits in their own country, rather than seek[ing] a more advantageous employment for their wealth in foreign nations", and (ii) capital was functionally immobile.

Ricardo's argument in favour of free trade has also been attacked by those who believe trade restriction can be necessary for the economic development of a nation. Utsa Patnaik claims that Ricardian theory of international trade contains a logical fallacy. Ricardo assumed that in both countries two goods are producible and actually are produced, but developed and underdeveloped countries often trade those goods which are not producible in their own country. In these cases, one cannot define which country has comparative advantage.

Critics also argue that Ricardo's theory of comparative advantage is flawed in that it assumes production is continuous and absolute. In the real world, events outside the realm of human control (e.g. natural disasters) can disrupt production. In this case, specialisation could cripple a country that depends on imports from foreign, naturally disrupted countries. For example, if an industrially based country trades its manufactured goods with an agrarian country in exchange for agricultural products, a natural disaster in the agricultural country (e.g. drought) may cause the industrially based country to starve.

As Joan Robinson pointed out, following the opening of free trade with England, Portugal endured centuries of economic underdevelopment: "the imposition of free trade on Portugal killed off a promising textile industry and left her with a slow-growing export market for wine, while for England, exports of cotton cloth led to accumulation, mechanisation and the whole spiralling growth of the industrial revolution". Robinson argued that Ricardo's example required that economies be in static equilibrium positions with full employment and that there could not be a trade deficit or a trade surplus. These conditions, she wrote, were not relevant to the real world. She also argued that Ricardo's math did not take into account that some countries may be at different levels of development and that this raised the prospect of 'unequal exchange' which might hamper a country's development, as we saw in the case of Portugal.

The development economist Ha-Joon Chang challenges the argument that free trade benefits every country:

Ricardo's theory is absolutely right—within its narrow confines. His theory correctly says that, accepting their current levels of technology as given, it is better for countries to specialize in things that they are relatively better at. One cannot argue with that. His theory fails when a country wants to acquire more advanced technologies—that is, when it wants to develop its economy. It takes time and experience to absorb new technologies, so technologically backward producers need a period of protection from international competition during this period of learning. Such protection is costly, because the country is giving up the chance to import better and cheaper products. However, it is a price that has to be paid if it wants to develop advanced industries. Ricardo's theory is, thus seen, for those who accept the status quo but not for those who want to change it.

== Ricardian equivalence ==
Another idea associated with Ricardo is Ricardian equivalence, an argument suggesting that in some circumstances a government's choice of how to pay for its spending (i.e., whether to use tax revenue or issue debt and run a deficit) might have no effect on the economy. This is due to the fact the public saves its excess money to pay for expected future tax increases that will be used to pay off the debt. Ricardo notes that the proposition is theoretically implied in the presence of intertemporal optimisation by rational taxpayers: but that since taxpayers do not act so rationally, the proposition fails to be true in practice. Thus, while the proposition bears his name, he does not seem to have believed it. Economist Robert Barro is responsible for its modern prominence.

== Influence and intellectual legacy ==
David Ricardo's ideas had a tremendous influence on later developments in economics. US economists rank Ricardo as the second most influential economic thinker, behind Adam Smith, prior to the twentieth century.

=== Ricardian socialists ===
Despite his laissez-faire capitalist views, Ricardo's writings fascinated a number of early socialists in the 1820s, who thought his value theory had radical implications. They argued that, in view of labour theory of value, labour produces the entire product, and the profits capitalists get are a result of exploitations of workers. These include Thomas Hodgskin, William Thompson, John Francis Bray, and Percy Ravenstone.

=== Georgists ===
Georgists believe that rent, in the sense that Ricardo used, belongs to the community as a whole. Henry George was greatly influenced by Ricardo, and often cited him, including in his most famous work, Progress and Poverty from 1879. In the preface to the fourth edition he wrote: "What I have done in this book, if I have correctly solved the great problem I have sought to investigate, is, to unite the truth perceived by the school of Smith and Ricardo to the truth perceived by the school of Proudhon and Lasalle; to show that laissez faire (in its full true meaning) opens the way to a realization of the noble dreams of socialism; to identify social law with moral law, and to disprove ideas which in the minds of many cloud grand and elevating perceptions."

=== Neo-Ricardians ===
After the rise of the 'neoclassical' school, Ricardo's influence declined temporarily. It was Piero Sraffa, the editor of the Collected Works of David Ricardo and the author of the seminal Production of Commodities by Means of Commodities, who resurrected Ricardo as the originator of another strand of economic thought, which was effaced with the arrival of the neoclassical school. The new interpretation of Ricardo and Sraffa's criticism against the marginal theory of value gave rise to a new school, now named neo-Ricardian or Sraffian school. Major contributors to this school include Luigi Pasinetti (1930–2023), Pierangelo Garegnani (1930–2011), Ian Steedman (1941–), Geoffrey Harcourt (1931–2021), Heinz Kurz (1946–), Neri Salvadori (1951–), Pier Paolo Saviotti (–) among others. See also Neo-Ricardianism. The Neo-Ricardian school is sometimes seen to be a component of Post-Keynesian economics.

==== Neo-Ricardian trade theory ====
Inspired by Piero Sraffa, a new strand of trade theory emerged and was named neo-Ricardian trade theory. The main contributors include Ian Steedman and Stanley Metcalfe. They have criticised neoclassical international trade theory, namely the Heckscher–Ohlin model on the basis that the notion of capital as primary factor has no method of measuring it before the determination of profit rate (thus trapped in a logical vicious circle). This was a second round of the Cambridge capital controversy, this time in the field of international trade. Depoortère and Ravix judge that neo-Ricardian contribution failed without giving effective impact on neoclassical trade theory, because it could not offer "a genuine alternative approach from a classical point of view."

==== Evolutionary growth theory ====
Several distinctive groups have sprung out of the neo-Ricardian school. One is the evolutionary growth theory, developed notably by Luigi Pasinetti, J.S. Metcalfe, Pier Paolo Saviotti, and Koen Frenken and others.

Pasinetti argued that the demand for any commodity came to stagnate and frequently decline, demand saturation occurs. Introduction of new commodities (goods and services) is necessary to avoid economic stagnation.

==== Contemporary theories ====
Ricardo's idea was even expanded to the case of continuum of goods by Dornbusch, Fischer, and Samuelson This formulation is employed for example by Matsuyama and others.

Ricardian trade theory ordinarily assumes that the labour is the unique input. This is a deficiency as intermediate goods occupies now a great part of international trade. The situation changed after the appearance of Yoshinori Shiozawa's work of 2007. He has succeeded to incorporate traded input goods in his model. His theory became more useful by the discovery of new definition of regular international values (a couple of wage rates for countries and prices for products), because it is not defined as the normal vector at a facet of world production possibility set, which is the set where all countries enjoy full employment. The new definition is given in Shiozawa and Fujimoto (2018) and in Shiozawa (2020). Shiozawa's theory of international values is now the unique theory of international trade that can treat unemployment and input trade in a general form.

Yeats found that 30% of world trade in manufacturing is intermediate inputs. Bardhan and Jafee found that intermediate inputs occupy 37 to 38% in the imports to the US for the years from 1992 to 1997, whereas the percentage of intrafirm trade grew from 43% in 1992 to 52% in 1997.

==== Unequal exchange ====
Chris Edward includes Emmanuel's unequal exchange theory among variations of neo-Ricardian trade theory. Arghiri Emmanuel argued that the Third World is poor because of the international exploitation of labour.

The unequal exchange theory of trade has been influential to the (new) dependency theory.

== Publications ==
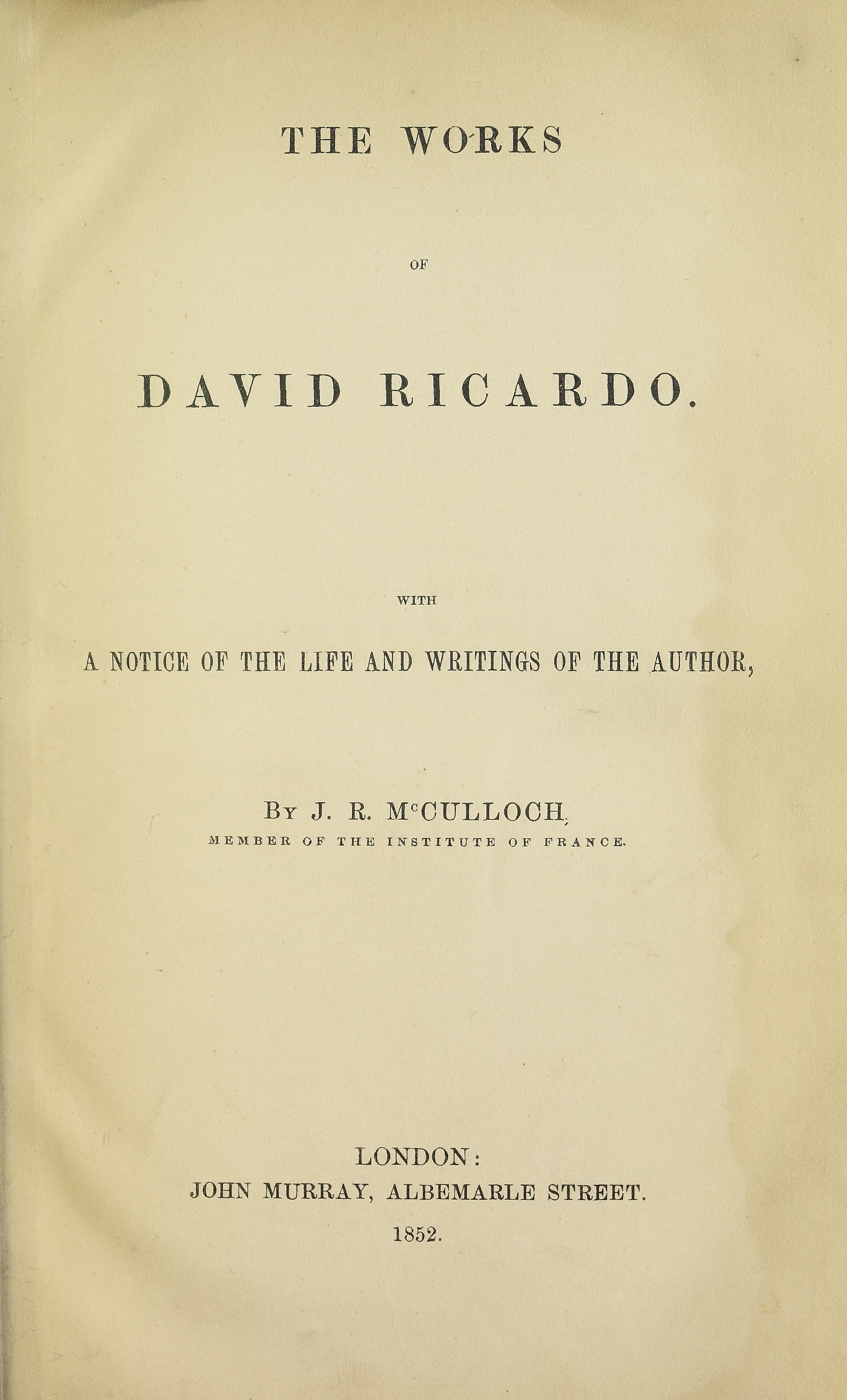
Works, 1852

Ricardo's publications included:

- The High Price of Bullion, a Proof of the Depreciation of Bank Notes (1810), which advocated the adoption of a metallic currency.
- An Essay on the Influence of a Low Price of Corn on the Profits of Stock (1815), which argued that repealing the Corn Laws would distribute more wealth to the productive members of society.
- On the Principles of Political Economy and Taxation (1817), an analysis that concluded that land rent grows as population increases. It also clearly laid out the theory of comparative advantage, which argued that all nations could benefit from free trade, even if a nation was less efficient at producing all kinds of goods than its trading partners.
- J.R. McCulloch, ed. (1852). The Works of David Ricardo : with a Notice of the Life and Writings of the Author. London: John Murray.

His works and writings were collected in Sraffa, Piero; Dobb, Maurice Herbert, eds. (1981) [1951]. The Works and Correspondence of David Ricardo (1st paperback ed.). Cambridge: Cambridge University Press. ISBN 0521285054. OCLC 10251383. (11 volumes)

== See also ==
- Critique of political economy

Parliament of the United Kingdom
Preceded by Richard Sharp	Member of Parliament for Portarlington; 1819–1823	Succeeded by James Farquhar
