= Heinz D. Kurz =

Heinz Dieter Kurz
- Born: March 29, 1946 (age 78)
- Title: Professor

Heinz D. Kurz (born 29 March 1946) is professor of economics at the University of Graz.

== Selected publications ==
- with Neri Salvadori as editor: The Elgar Companion to David Ricardo. Edward Elgar, Cheltenham, England 2015, ISBN 978-1-84844-850-6.
- Geschichte des ökonomischen Denkens, Beck, München 2013, ISBN 978-3-406-6555-3-1.
- with Richard Sturn: Die größten Ökonomen. Adam Smith. UTB, Stuttgart 2012, ISBN 978-3-8252-3793-6.
- with Richard Sturn: Schumpeter für jedermann. Von der Rastlosigkeit des Kapitalismus. Frankfurter Allgemeine Buchverlag, Frankfurt am Main 2012, ISBN 978-3-89981-260-2.
- as editor: Klassiker des ökonomischen Denkens. Band 1, Verlag C. H. Beck, München 2008, ISBN 978-3-406-57357-6 und Band 2, München 2009, ISBN 978-3-406-57372-9.
- as editor: David Ricardo: Über die Grundsätze der politischen Ökonomie und der Besteuerung. Verlag Metropolis, 2006, ISBN 3-89518-540-X.
- with Neri Salvadori: Theory of Production: A Long-Period Analysis. Cambridge University Press, Cambridge 1997, ISBN 0-521-58867-7.
