= Shannon C. Stimson =

- Born: October 8, 1951 (age 75)
- Awards: David and Elaine Spitz Prize

Education
- Education: Harvard University

Philosophical work
- Institutions: University of California, Berkeley
- Main interests: Adam Smith, history of economics
- Website: vcresearch.berkeley.edu/faculty/shannon-c-stimson

Shannon C. Stimson (born October 8, 1951) is an American political theorist and historian of ideas, whose more recent work and teaching spans the economic and political thought of the early modern period through the nineteenth century. She is the Thomas and Dorothy Leavey Chair in the Government department at Georgetown University. Her academic posts have included appointments at Harvard University (1984-1991), UC Berkeley (1991-2014), the Fulbright Professorship in the United Kingdom, the Christensen Fellowship of St. Catherine's College, Oxford, the John K. Castle Chair in Ethics, Politics and Economics at Yale University and she has been a Distinguished Academic Visitor at Queens' College, Cambridge on two occasions. Her research has been supported through fellowships from the Mellon Foundation, the National Endowment for the Humanities, the American Association of University Women, as well as by several prize fellowships. Her articles have appeared in numerous edited volumes, journals of political thought, economics, the history of economic thought, and political science in America and Europe. She has served on the editorial boards of the American Political Science Review, the Adam Smith Review, and the Journal of Politics.

== Research ==
Stimson's early work focused on the intersection of legal, constitutional, and revolutionary thought in 17th and 18th century Anglo-America. Her work focused on the study of both English and colonial juries in revolutionary periods and introduced to political theory the concept of "judicial space" as an incisive tool for organizing, interpreting, and evaluating various strands of English and American political thought, and for challenging the assumption of a basic unity of vision at the roots of Anglo-American jurisprudence. She introduced the judicial space concept to political theory in order to account for the development of the highly political role of the new Supreme Court in late 18th-century and early 19th-century American political thought, a judicial body having no clear, previous counterpart in English jurisprudence.

Stimson's work in the history and theory of political economy has focused on the intersection and mutual interplay of economic and political theorizing and debate in the writing of the classical political economists after Adam Smith. This work, undertaken together with Cambridge economist Murray Milgate, has emphasized one set of conceptual transformations in politics and political economy that took place during a part of what has been called the classical period of political economy, and directly challenged the casual association of Smith's name and ideological imprimatur with contemporary neoclassical and neoconservative economic arguments for the reestablishment of an "invisible hand" as the prime regulator of complex national and globalized markets, as well as the unsubstantiated belief in a putatively Smithian inspired version of perfect competition to promote efficiency in the allocation of resources such that all would be fully utilized to the greatest social and individual benefit. The importance of her work on this topic has been recognized in 2011 with its receipt of the David and Elaine Spitz Prize from the International Conference for the Study of Political Thought. This international award, honoring the best book in liberal and/or democratic theory published in the previous two years, has in the past honored as well the work of political thinkers and philosophers such as John Rawls, Sheldon Wolin, Martha Nussbaum, Robert Dahl, and Joseph Raz.

== Selected bibliography ==
=== Books ===
- Stimson, Shannon C. (1990). The American Revolution in the law: Anglo-American jurisprudence before John Marshall. Princeton, New Jersey: Princeton University Press. ISBN 9780691078748.
  - Reprinted in 2014 as: Stimson, Shannon C. (July 2014). The American Revolution in the law: Anglo-American jurisprudence before John Marshall. Princeton University Press. ISBN 9780691604381.
- Stimson, Shannon C.; Milgate, Murray (1991). Ricardian politics. Princeton, New Jersey: Princeton University Press. ISBN 9780691042787.
- Stimson, Shannon C.; Milgate, Murray (2011). After Adam Smith: a century of transformation in politics and political economy. Princeton, New Jersey Woodstock: Princeton University Press. ISBN 9780691152349.
- Stimson, Shannon C. T.R.Malthus, Essay on the Principle of Population (1803 edition). Editor and contributor. Yale University Press, 2018.

=== Chapters in books ===
- Stimson, Shannon C. (1987), "Jonathan Swift", in Milgate, Murray; Eatwell, John; Newman, Peter K. (eds.), The New Palgrave: a dictionary of economics, vol. IV, London New York Tokyo: Macmillan Stockton Press Maruzen, ISBN 9780333740408
- Stimson, Shannon C. (1987), "Social Democracy", in Milgate, Murray; Eatwell, John; Newman, Peter K. (eds.), The New Palgrave: a dictionary of economics, vol. IV, London New York Tokyo: Macmillan Stockton Press Maruzen, ISBN 9780333740408
- Stimson, Shannon C. (1987), "Rousseau", in Milgate, Murray; Eatwell, John; Newman, Peter K. (eds.), The New Palgrave: a dictionary of economics, vol. IV, London New York Tokyo: Macmillan Stockton Press Maruzen, ISBN 9780333740408
- Stimson, Shannon C.; Welch, Cheryl B. (1989), "Republicanism and the recovery of the political in Adam Smith", in Milgate, Murray (ed.), Critical issues in social thought, London San Diego: Academic Press, ISBN 9780124962484
- Stimson, Shannon C. (1990), "A jury of the country: common sense philosophy and the jurisprudence of James Wilson", in Sher, Richard B.; Smitten, Jeffrey R. (eds.), Scotland and America in the age of the enlightenment, Princeton, New Jersey: Princeton University Press, ISBN 9780691055534
- Stimson, Shannon C. (1993), "Reflections on the economic interpretation of the constitution", in Stimson, Shannon C.; Hart, Vivien (eds.), Writing a national identity: political, economic, and cultural perspectives on the written constitution, Manchester, UK New York, New York, USA: Manchester University Press in association with the Fulbright Commission, London Distributed in the USA and Canada by St. Martin's Press, ISBN 9780719035890
- Stimson, Shannon C. (1995), "Alexander Hamilton", in Kloppenberg, James T.; Fox, Richard Wightman (eds.), A companion to American thought, Malden, Massachusetts Oxford: Blackwell Publishers, ISBN 9780631206569
- Stimson, Shannon C. (1995), "John Adams", in Kloppenberg, James T.; Fox, Richard Wightman (eds.), A companion to American thought, Malden, Massachusetts Oxford: Blackwell Publishers, ISBN 9780631206569
- Stimson, Shannon C. (1995), "Foreword", in Post, C. Gordon (ed.), A disquisition on government (and selections from the discourse), Indianapolis: Hackett Publishing Co., pp. vii–x, ISBN 9780872202931
- Stimson, Shannon C. (1995), "Changing perspectives on John C. Calhoun", in Post, C. Gordon (ed.), Calhoun: a disquisition on government (and selections from the discourse), Indianapolis: Hackett Publishing Co., ISBN 9780872202931
- Stimson, Shannon C.; Milgate, Murray (1998), "Hume on law and economics", in Newman, Peter K. (ed.), The new Palgrave dictionary of economics and the law (3 volume set), vol. 2, London New York: Macmillan Reference Stockton Press, ISBN 9780333676677
- Stimson, Shannon C. (2005), "Dugald Stewart", in Claeys, Gregory (ed.), Encyclopedia of nineteenth-century thought, London New York: Routledge, pp. 459–460, ISBN 9780415244190
- Stimson, Shannon C. (2005), "Dugald Stewart", in Claeys, Gregory (ed.), Encyclopedia of nineteenth-century thought, London New York: Routledge, pp. 459–460, ISBN 9780415244190
- Stimson, Shannon C. (2008), "Constitutionalism and the rule of law", in Phillips, Anne; Bonnie, Honig; Dryzek, John S. (eds.), The Oxford handbook of political theory, Oxford: Oxford University Press, pp. 317–332, ISBN 9780199548439
- Stimson, Shannon C.; Bevir, Mark; Adcock, Robert (2007), "A history of political science: how? what? why?", in Stimson, Shannon C.; Bevir, Mark; Adcock, Robert (eds.), Modern political science Anglo-American exchanges since 1880, Princeton: Princeton University Press, pp. 1–17, ISBN 9780691128733
- Stimson, Shannon C.; Bevir, Mark; Adcock, Robert (2007), "Historicizing the new institutionalism(s)", in Stimson, Shannon C.; Bevir, Mark; Adcock, Robert (eds.), Modern political science Anglo-American exchanges since 1880, Princeton: Princeton University Press, pp. 259–289, ISBN 9780691128733
- Stimson, Shannon C. (2014), "Adam Smith (definition)", in Coole, Diana H.; Gibbons, Michael; Ellis, Elisabeth; et al. (eds.), The encyclopedia of political thought, 8 volume set, Chichester, West Sussex, UK Malden, Massachusetts: Wiley-Blackwell, ISBN 9781405191296
- Stimson, Shannon C. (2014), "Classical Political Economy (definition)", in Coole, Diana H.; Gibbons, Michael; Ellis, Elisabeth; et al. (eds.), The encyclopedia of political thought, 8 volume set, Chichester, West Sussex, UK Malden, Massachusetts: Wiley-Blackwell, ISBN 9781405191296
- Stimson, Shannon C. (2015), "The General Will after Rousseau: Smith and Rousseau on Sociability and Inequality", in Farr, James; Williams, David (eds.), The General Will: The Evolution of a Concept, Cambridge, Cambridgeshire: Cambridge University Press, pp. 350–381, doi:10.1017/CBO9781107297982.018, ISBN 978-1-107-05701-2
- Stimson, Shannon C. (2018), "Malthus: An Essay on the Principle of Population", in O'Flaherty, Niall (ed.), Essay on the Principle of Population (1803) by Thomas Robert Malthus, New Haven: Yale University Press, Rethinking the Western Tradition Series, JSTOR j.ctv1bvnf95
- Stimson, Shannon C. (2021), "The Political Arithmetic of Transmutation: Heterodoxy and Political Economy in Sir William Petty (1623–1687)", in van der Tol, Mariëtta; Adenitire, John; Brown, Carys; Kempson, E. S. (eds.), From Toleration to Religious Freedom: Cross-Disciplinary Perspectives, Bern: Peter Lang

=== Edited volumes ===
- Stimson, Shannon C.; Hart, Vivien (1993). Writing a national identity: political, economic, and cultural perspectives on the written constitution. Manchester, UK New York, New York, USA: Manchester University Press in association with the Fulbright Commission, London Distributed in the USA and Canada by St. Martin's Press. ISBN 9780719035890.
- Stimson, Shannon C.; Bevir, Mark; Adcock, Robert (2007). Modern political science Anglo-American exchanges since 1880. Princeton: Princeton University Press. ISBN 9780691128733.

Reviewed in Reviewer (2010). "Book reviews". The European Legacy: Toward New Paradigms. 15 (4): 511. doi:10.1080/10848770.2010.489324.

=== Journal articles ===
- Stimson, Shannon C.; Milgate, Murray (1991). "Economic opinion on parliamentary reform: the case of Ricardo". Contributions to Political Economy. 10 (1): 21–45. doi:10.1093/oxfordjournals.cpe.a035594.
- Stimson, Shannon C.; Milgate, Murray (December 1993). "Utility, property, and political participation: James Mill on democratic reform". American Political Science Review. 87 (4): 901–911. doi:10.2307/2938822. JSTOR 2938822.
- Stimson, Shannon C.; Milgate, Murray (July 1996). "The figure of Smith: Dugald Stewart and the propagation of Smithian economics". The European Journal of the History of Economic Thought. 3 (2): 225–253. doi:10.1080/10427719600000024.
- Stimson, Shannon C. (December 2000). "Rethinking the state: perspectives on the legibility and reproduction of political societies". Political Theory. 28 (6): 822–834. doi:10.1177/0090591700028006006. S2CID 144146410.
- Stimson, Shannon C.; Milgate, Murray (June 2001). "Mill, liberty and the facts of life" (PDF). Political Studies. 49 (2): 231–248. doi:10.1111/1467-9248.00311. S2CID 55643207.
- Stimson, Shannon C. (January 2004). "Introduction — the science of politics: then and now". PS: Political Science and Politics. 37 (1). Cambridge University Press: 33–35. doi:10.1017/S1049096504003580.
- Stimson, Shannon C.; Milgate, Murray (November 2004). "The rise and fall of civil society". Contributions to Political Economy. 23 (1): 9–34. doi:10.1093/conpec/bzh010.
- Stimson, Shannon C. (March 2004). "From invisible hand to moral restraint: the transformation of the market mechanism from Adam Smith to Thomas Robert Malthus". The Journal of Scottish Philosophy. 2 (1): 22–47. doi:10.3366/jsp.2004.2.1.22.
- Stimson, Shannon C.; Milgate, Murray (December 2008). "Brief lives: economic life and political life in the history of economic thought". Public Choice. 137 (3–4): 491–505. doi:10.1007/s11127-008-9326-6. S2CID 144913299.

=== Book reviews ===
- Stimson, Shannon C. (Summer 1983). "Calabresi on the problem of statutory middle-age: judicial cure or political prescription? (Guido Calabresi, A common law for the age of statutes)". Harvard Civil Rights-Civil Liberties Law Review. 18 (2). Heinonline.
- Stimson, Shannon C. (June 1984). "Brandeis by Lewis J. Paper". The Journal of American History. 71 (1): 151–152. doi:10.2307/1899890. JSTOR 1899890.
- Stimson, Shannon C. (March 1986). "Gray on Hayek on liberty". Contributions to Political Economy. 5 (1): 97–100. doi:10.1093/oxfordjournals.cpe.a035707.
- Stimson, Shannon C. (August 1991). "The province of legislation determined: legal theory in eighteenth-century Britain by David Lieberman (book series: ideas in context)". Political Theory. 19 (3): 462–465. doi:10.1177/0090591791019003011. S2CID 220901550.
- Stimson, Shannon C. (April 1995). "Constitutional history of the American revolution. Volume III: the authority to legislate. Volume IV: the authority of law. by John Phillip Reid". The William and Mary Quarterly. 52 (2): 361–363. doi:10.2307/2946989. JSTOR 2946989.
- Stimson, Shannon C. (September 2000). "Adam Smith and the virtues of enlightenment by Griswold Charles L. Jr. Cambridge: Cambridge University Press, 1999. 412p. $59.95 cloth, $21.95 paper". American Political Science Review. 94 (3): 708–709. doi:10.2307/2585849. JSTOR 2585849.
- Stimson, Shannon C. (June 2007). "Representative democracy: principles and genealogy by Nadia Urbanati". Perspectives on Politics. 5 (2): 360–361. doi:10.1017/S153759270707096X.
- Stimson, Shannon C. (February 2008). "Political and economic theory in the 18th century: Istvan Hont, The jealousy of trade: international competition and the nation state. Cambridge, MA: Harvard University Press, 2005". History of the Human Sciences. 21 (1): 161–165. doi:10.1177/09526951080210010104. S2CID 144915120.
- Stimson, Shannon C. (October 2011). "Rethinking ideas in context". Political Theory. 39 (5): 674–681. doi:10.1177/0090591711413751. S2CID 146949063.
- Stimson, Shannon C. (October 2012). "Jack P. Greene: The constitutional origins of the American revolution". The American Historical Review. 117 (4): 1213–1214. doi:10.1093/ahr/117.4.1213.
