= Stefano Zamagni =

Italian economist

Stefano Zamagni KSG
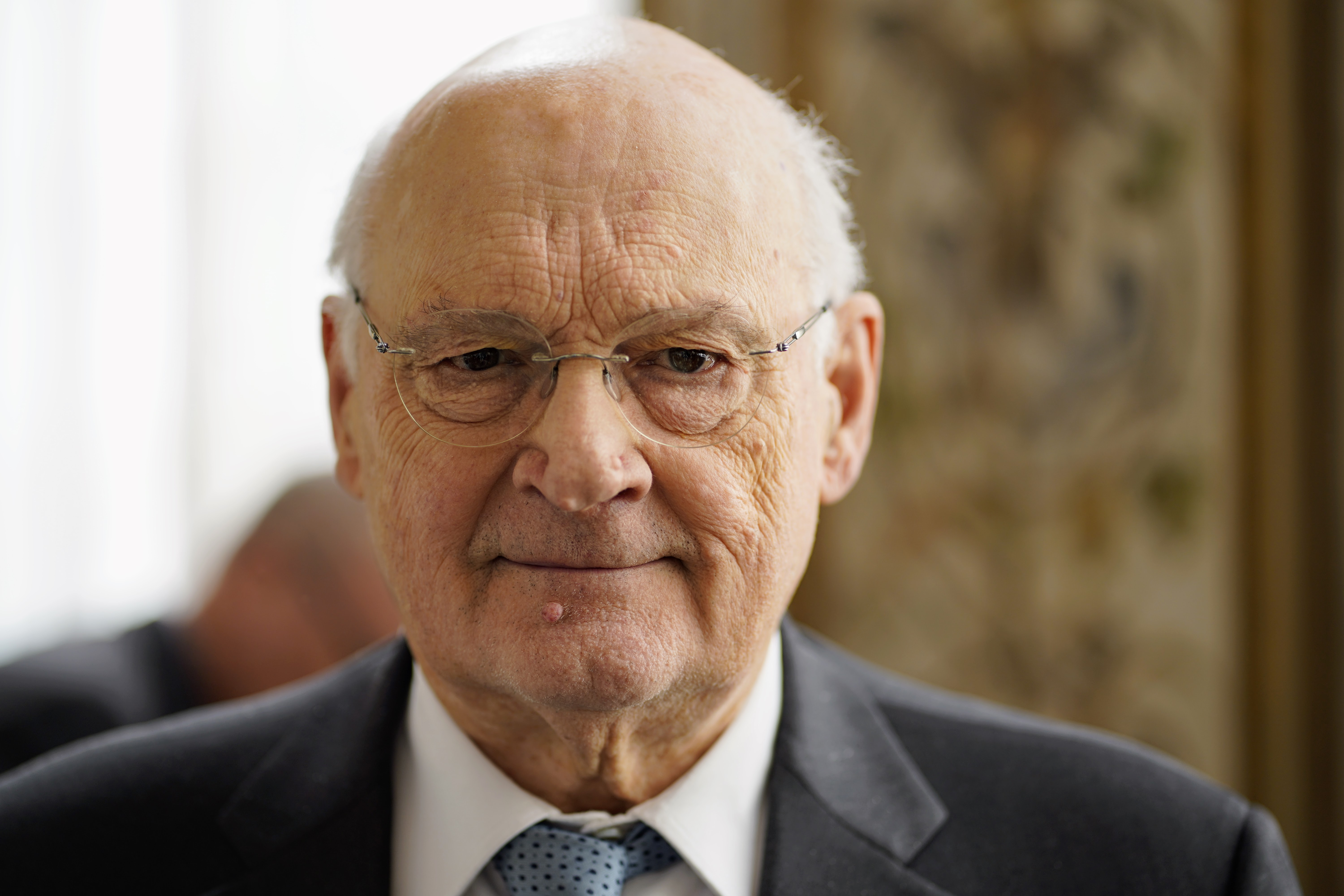
- Zamagni in 2020
- Born: 4 January 1943 (age 83); Rimini, Italy
- Spouse: Vera Negri Zamagni (m. 1968)

Academic background
- Education: Università Cattolica del Sacro Cuore
- Influences: Pierpaolo Donati

Academic work
- Discipline: Economics
- Sub-discipline: International economics; welfare economics
- Institutions: University of Parma; University of Bologna

Stefano Zamagni KSG (born 4 January 1943) is an Italian economist. Born in Rimini, Zamagni is Professor of Economics at the University of Bologna. Zamagni is also a fellow of the Human Development and Capability Association and former President of the Pontifical Academy of Social Sciences.

== Selected bibliography ==
=== Books ===
- Zamagni, Stefano (1993). Microeconomic Theory: An Introduction. Aldershot, England: Gregg Revivals. ISBN 978-0-7512-0261-8.
- Cozzi, Terenzio; Zamagni, Stefano (1995). Elementi di economia politica (in Italian). Bologna: Il Mulino. ISBN 978-88-15-05198-1.
- Zamagni, Stefano (1995). The Economics of Altruism. Aldershot, England: Edward Elgar. ISBN 978-1-85278-953-4.
- Screpanti, Ernesto; Zamagni, Stefano (2005). An Outline of the History of Economic Thought. Translated by Field, David; Kirby, Lynn (2nd ed.). Oxford: Oxford University Press. doi:10.1093/0199279144.001.0001. ISBN 978-0-19-927914-2.
- Bruni, Luigino; Zamagni, Stefano (2007). Civil Economy: Efficiency, Equity, Public Happiness. Frontiers of Business Ethics. Vol. 2. Bern: Peter Lang. ISBN 978-3-03910-896-1. ISSN 1661-4844.
- Scazzieri, Roberto; Sen, Amartya; Zamagni, Stefano, eds. (2008). Markets, Money and Capital: Hicksian Economics for the Twenty-first Century. Cambridge, England: Cambridge University Press. doi:10.1017/CBO9780511575969. ISBN 978-0-521-87321-5.
- Zamagni, Stefano; Zamagni, Vera (2010). Cooperative Enterprise: Facing the Challenge of Globalization. Cheltenham, England: Edward Elgar. ISBN 978-1-84980-314-4.
- Bruni, Luigino; Zamagni, Stefano (2013). Handbook on the Economics of Reciprocity and Social Enterprise. Cheltenham, England: Edward Elgar. ISBN 978-1-84980-474-5.

=== Chapters in books ===
- Zamagni, Stefano (2005), “Happiness and individualism: a very difficult union” in L. Bruni e P. Porta (eds.), Economics and Happiness, Oxford, Oxford University Press, 2005, pp. 303–334.
- Zamagni, Stefano (2006), “The ethical anchoring of Corporate Social responsibility”, in L. Zsolnai (eds.), Interdisciplinary Yearbook of Business Ethics, Vol. I, 2006, pp. 31–51.
- Zamagni, Stefano (2007), "Positional competition and jobless growth: the role of civil economy", in Loose, D.; Waandors, S. (eds.), Work and human dignity in the context of globalization, Budel (NL): Damon, pp. 62–79.
- Zamagni, Stefano (2008), "Reciprocity, civil economy, common good", in Archer, M.; Donati, P. (eds.), Pursuing the common good, Vatican City: The Pontifical Academy of Social Sciences, pp. 467–502.
- Zamagni, Stefano (2008), "Between theory and history: on the identity of Hicks's economics", in Zamagni, Stefano; Sen, Amartya; Scazzieri, Roberto (eds.), Markets, money and capital: Hicksian economics for the twenty-first century, Cambridge, UK New York: Cambridge University Press, pp. 1–40, ISBN 9780521873215.
- Zamagni, Stefano (2008) [1987], "Georgescu-Roegen, Nicholas", in Eatwell, John; Milgate, Murray; Newman, Peter K. (eds.), The New Palgrave: a dictionary of economics volume 2, London New York Tokyo: Macmillan Stockton Press Maruzen, pp. 515–516, ISBN 9780333740408.
- Zamagni, Stefano (2010), "Catholic social thought, civil economy and the spirit of capitalism", in Finn, D. (ed.), The true wealth of nations, Oxford: Oxford University Press, pp. 63–94.
- Zamagni, Stefano (2011). "Fraternity, Gift and Reciprocity in Caritas in Veritate". In Pabst, Adrian (ed.). The Crisis of Global Capitalism: Pope Benedict XVI's Social Encyclical and the Future of Political Economy. Eugene, Oregon: Cascade Books. pp. 155–171. ISBN 978-1-60899-368-0.

=== Journal articles ===
- Zamagni, Stefano (1991). "Hicks on Capital and Growth". Review of Political Economy. 3 (3): 249–267. doi:10.1080/09538259100000011. ISSN 1465-3982.
- Zamagni, Stefano (1991). "Towards an Economics of Human Relations: On the Role of Psychology in Economics". Group Analysis. 37 (1): 17–32. doi:10.1177/0533316404040992. ISSN 1461-717X. S2CID 145576351.
- Maneschi, Andrea; Zamagni, Stefano (1997). "Nicholas Georgescu-Roegen, 1906–1994". The Economic Journal. 107 (442): 695–707. doi:10.1111/j.1468-0297.1997.tb00035.x. ISSN 1468-0297. JSTOR 2957794.
- Zamagni, Stefano (2003). "A Socio-economic Reading of Globalisation". Society and Economy. 25 (2): 181–205. doi:10.1556/socec.25.2003.2.6. ISSN 1588-970X. JSTOR 41471970.

Catholic Church titles
Preceded by Margaret Archer	President of the Pontifical Academy of Social Sciences; 2019–present	Incumbent
