= Kevin W. S. Roberts =

British economist

Kevin W. S. Roberts FBA

Academic background
- Education: University of Oxford; University of Essex
- Academic advisor: James Mirrlees

Academic work
- Discipline: Microeconomic theory, welfare economics and social choice theory
- Institutions: Nuffield College, University of Oxford
- Doctoral students: Daron Acemoglu, Thomas Piketty, Jan Eeckhout
- Website: Information at IDEAS / RePEc

Notes
- Thesis Welfare theoretic social choice. (1977)

Kevin W. S. Roberts FBA was the Sir John Hicks Professor of Economics at the University of Oxford until his retirement in 2020.

He was a professorial fellow of Nuffield College, a fellow of the British Academy and a fellow of the Econometric Society.

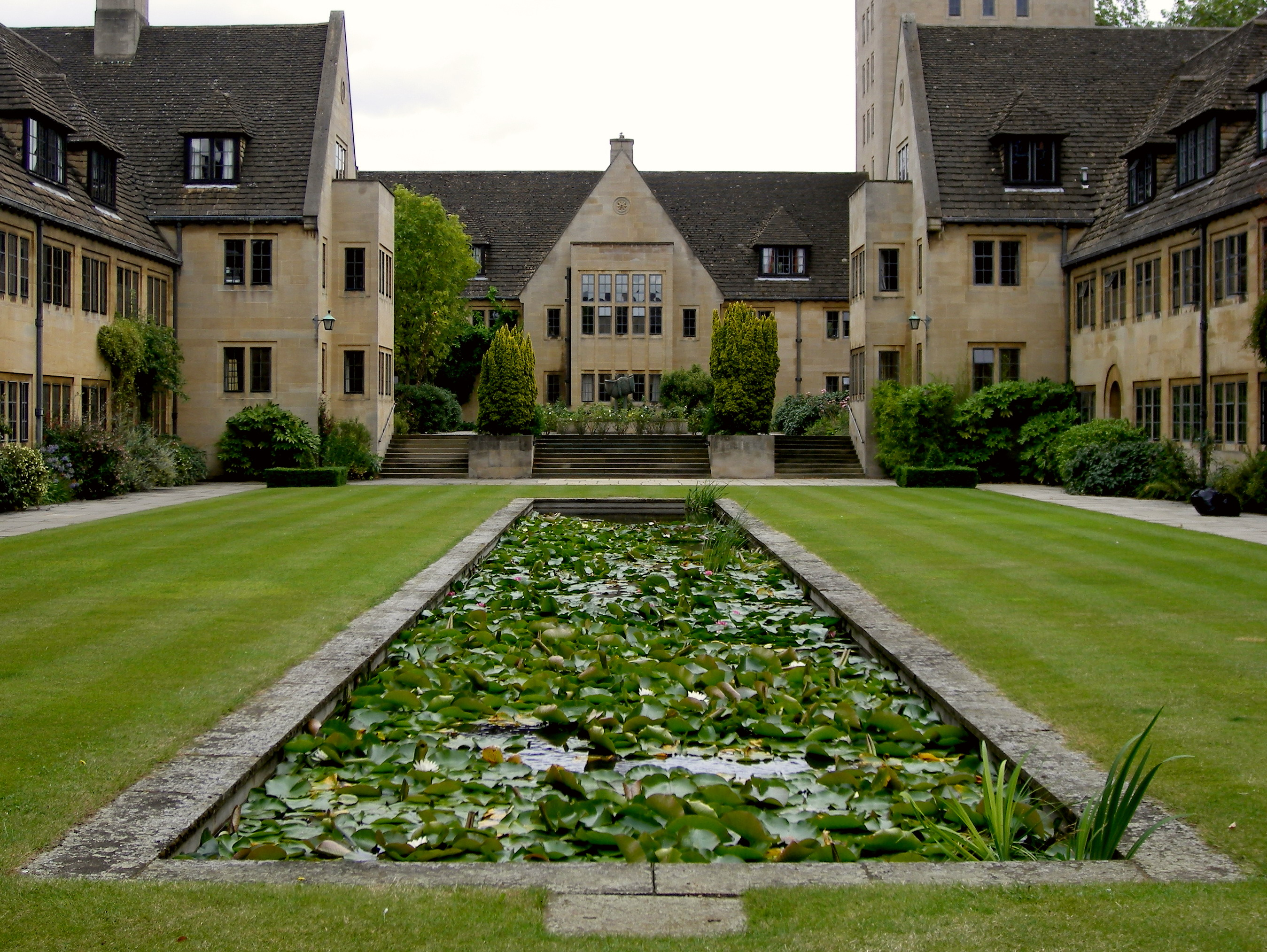
Nuffield College, University of Oxford.

== Education ==
Kevin Roberts gained his doctorate from the University of Oxford in 1977.

== Fellowships ==
- 1987 Econometric Society.
- 2007 British Academy.
- Professorial Fellow, Nuffield College.

== Selected bibliography ==
=== Chapters in books ===
- Roberts, Kevin W.S. (1979), "The characterization of implementable choice rules", in Laffont, Jean-Jacques (ed.), Aggregation and revelation of preferences, Amsterdam New York New York: North-Holland Publishing Co. sole distributors for the U.S.A. and Canada, Elsevier North-Holland, ISBN 978-0-444-85326-4
- Roberts, Kevin W.S. (1982), "The limit points to monopolistic competition", in Mas-Colell, Andreu (ed.), Noncooperative approaches to the theory of perfect competition, New York: Academic Press, ISBN 978-0-12-476750-8
- Roberts, Kevin W.S. (1985), "Cartel behaviour and asymmetric information", in Geroski, Paul; Phlips, Louis; Ulph, Alistair (eds.), Oligopoly, competition, and welfare, Oxford, Oxfordshire, UK New York, New York, USA: B. Blackwell, ISBN 978-0-631-14479-3
- Roberts, Kevin W.S. (1987), ""Collusion" (definition)", in Eatwell, John; Milgate, Murray; Newman, Peter K. (eds.), The New Palgrave: a dictionary of economics, London New York Tokyo: Macmillan Stockton Press Maruzen, ISBN 978-0-333-74040-8
- Roberts, Kevin W.S. (1987), ""Enforcement" (definition)", in Eatwell, John; Milgate, Murray; Newman, Peter K. (eds.), The New Palgrave: a dictionary of economics, London New York Tokyo: Macmillan Stockton Press Maruzen, ISBN 978-0-333-74040-8
- Roberts, Kevin W.S. (1995), "Valued opinions or opinionated values: the double aggregation problem", in Basu, Kaushik; Suzumura, Kotaro; Pattanaik, Prasanta (eds.), Choice, welfare, and development: a festschrift in honour of Amartya K. Sen, Oxford New York: Clarendon Press Oxford University Press, ISBN 978-0-19-828789-6
- Roberts, Kevin W.S.; Felli, Leonardo Felli (2000), "Competition and hold-ups", in Stern, Nicholas H.; Atkinson, Anthony B.; Glennerster, Howard (eds.), Putting economics to work: volume in honour of Michio Morishima, vol. 22, London: London School of Economics and Political Science, and the STICERD - Suntory-Toyota International Centre for Economics and Related Disciplines, ISBN 978-0-7530-1399-1
- Roberts, Kevin W.S. (2000), "A reconsideration of the optimal income tax", in Myles, Gareth D.; Hammond, Peter (eds.), Incentives, organization, and public economics: papers in honour of Sir James Mirrlees, Oxford New York: Oxford University Press, ISBN 978-0-19-924229-0
- Roberts, Kevin W.S. (2009), "Irrelevant alternatives", in Basu, Kaushik; Kanbur, Ravi (eds.), Arguments for a better world: essays in honor of Amartya Sen, Oxford New York: Oxford University Press, pp. 231–249, ISBN 978-0-19-923911-5
- Roberts, Kevin W.S. (2009), "Social choice theory and the informational basis approach", in Morris, Christopher W. (ed.), Amartya Sen, New York: Cambridge University Press, p. 115, ISBN 978-0-521-85291-3

=== Journal articles ===
1971–1980

- Roberts, Kevin W.S.; Goodin, Robert E. (September 1975). "The ethical voter". The American Political Science Review. 69 (3): 926–928. doi:10.2307/1958406. JSTOR 1958406. S2CID 146590861.
- Roberts, Kevin W.S. (December 1977). "Voting over income tax schedules". Journal of Public Economics. 8 (3): 329–340. doi:10.1016/0047-2727(77)90005-6.
- Roberts, Kevin W.S. (March 1979). "Welfare considerations of nonlinear pricing". The Economic Journal. 89 (353): 66–83. doi:10.2307/2231407. JSTOR 2231407.
- Roberts, Kevin W.S. (January 1980). "Possibility theorems with interpersonally comparable welfare levels". The Review of Economic Studies. 47 (2): 409–420. doi:10.2307/2297001. JSTOR 2297001.
- Roberts, Kevin W.S. (January 1980). "Interpersonal comparability and social choice theory". The Review of Economic Studies. 47 (2): 421–439. doi:10.2307/2297002. JSTOR 2297002.
- Roberts, Kevin W.S. (January 1980). "Social choice theory: the single-profile and multi-profile approaches". The Review of Economic Studies. 47 (2): 441–50. doi:10.2307/2297003. JSTOR 2297003.
- Roberts, Kevin W.S.; Neary, J. Peter (January 1980). "The theory of household behaviour under rationing" (PDF). European Economic Review. 13 (1): 25–42. doi:10.1016/0014-2921(80)90045-8.
- Roberts, Kevin W.S. (April 1980). "The limit points of monopolistic competition". Journal of Economic Theory. 22 (2): 256–278. doi:10.1016/0022-0531(80)90043-5.
- Roberts, Kevin W.S. (June 1980). "Price-independent welfare prescriptions". Journal of Public Economics. 13 (3): 277–297. doi:10.1016/0047-2727(86)90007-1.

1981–1990

- Roberts, Kevin W.S.; Weitzman, Martin L. (September 1981). "Funding criteria for research, development, and exploration projects" (PDF). Econometrica. 49 (5): 1261–1288. doi:10.2307/1912754. hdl:1721.1/35160. JSTOR 1912754.
- Roberts, Kevin W.S. (March 1982). "Desirable fiscal policies under Keynesian unemployment". Oxford Economic Papers. 34 (1). Oxford University Press: 1–22. doi:10.1093/oxfordjournals.oep.a041537. JSTOR 2662737.
- Roberts, Kevin W.S. (February 1983). "Social choice rules and real-valued representations". Journal of Economic Theory. 29 (1): 72–94. doi:10.1016/0022-0531(83)90123-0.
- Roberts, Kevin W.S.; Guesnerie, Roger (January 1984). "Effective policy tools and quantity controls" (PDF). Econometrica. 52 (1): 59–86. doi:10.2307/1911461. JSTOR 1911461.
- Roberts, Kevin W.S. (April 1984). "The theoretical limits to redistribution". Review of Economic Studies. 51 (2): 177–195. doi:10.2307/2297686. JSTOR 2297686.
- Roberts, Kevin W.S. (June 1985). "Cartel behaviour and adverse selection". Journal of Industrial Economics. 33 (4): 401–413. doi:10.2307/2098383. JSTOR 2098383.
- Roberts, Kevin W.S.; Guesnerie, Roger (February–March 1987). "Minimum wage legislation as a second best policy". European Economic Review. 31 (1–2): 490–498. doi:10.1016/0014-2921(87)90067-5.

1991–2000

- Roberts, Kevin W.S. (December 1996). "Objective interpersonal comparisons of utility". Social Choice and Welfare. 14 (1): 79–96. doi:10.1007/s003550050053. S2CID 154546248.
- Roberts, Kevin W.S. (August 1999). "Rationality and the LeChatelier principle". Journal of Economic Theory. 87 (2): 416–428. doi:10.1006/jeth.1999.2544.

2001–2010

- Roberts, Kevin W.S. (October 2007). "Condorcet cycles? A model of intertemporal voting". Social Choice and Welfare. 29 (3): 383–404. doi:10.1007/s00355-006-0211-2. S2CID 3848976.
- Roberts, Kevin W.S. (November 2007). "The participant's curse and the perception of unequal treatment". Economics Letters. 97 (2): 162–169. doi:10.1016/j.econlet.2007.02.037.
- Roberts, Kevin W.S. (November 2007). "Wage and employment determination through non-cooperative bargaining". Scottish Journal of Political Economy. 54 (5): 699–720. doi:10.1111/j.1467-9485.2007.00437.x. S2CID 6881186.
- Roberts, Kevin W.S.; Maskin, Eric S. (May 2008). "On the fundamental theorems of general equilibrium". Economic Theory. 35 (2): 233–240. doi:10.1007/s00199-007-0233-8. S2CID 16340673.

=== Papers ===
- Roberts, Kevin W.S.; Weitzman, Martin L. (1979). Funding criteria for research, development, and exploration projects (issue 234 of working paper). Massachusetts: Department of Economics, Massachusetts Institute of Technology. OCLC 5012947.
- Roberts, Kevin W.S.; Grodal, Birgit; Hahn, F.; Hildenbrand, W.; Polemarchakis, H. (1994). General equilibrium 40th anniversary conference: held at CORE on 3-5 June 1993 (discussion paper). Vol. 9482. Louvain: CORE - Center for Operations Research and Econometrics, Université Catholique de Lopuvain. OCLC 258562027.
- Roberts, Kevin W.S. (January 1999). Dynamic voting in clubs (Discussion paper). London: London School of Economics and the STICERD - Suntory-Toyota International Centre for Economics and Related Disciplines. OCLC 154666869.
- Roberts, Kevin W.S.; Felli, Leonardo (2002). Does competition solve the hold-up problem? (Discussion paper). London: Centre for Economic Policy Research. OCLC 50900485.
