= Roger Guesnerie =

French economist and academic (1943–2026)

- Born: 17 February 1943; Sainte-Gemmes-le-Robert, Mayenne, France
- Died: 4 January 2026 (aged 82); Paris, France

Academic background
- Education: École Polytechnique; École nationale des ponts et chaussées
- Doctoral advisor: Jean-Jacques Laffont

Academic work
- Discipline: Economic theory Macroeconomics; Public economics
- School or tradition: Mathematical economics
- Institutions: Collège de France; École des hautes études en sciences sociales Paris School of Economics
- Doctoral students: Thomas Piketty
- Awards: President, Econometric Society (1996); President, French Association of Economic Sciences (2002–2003); President, European Economic Association (1994); Foreign Honorary Member of the American Economic Association; Foreign Honorary Member, American Academy of Arts and Sciences; CNRS Silver Medal; Chevalier de l'Ordre National du Mérite; Chevalier de la Légion d'honneur
- Website: Information at IDEAS / RePEc

Roger Guesnerie (17 February 1943 – 4 January 2026) was a French academic and economist. He was last the Chaired Professor of Economic Theory and Social Organization of the Collège de France, Director of Studies at the École des hautes études en sciences sociales, and the chairman of the board of directors of the Paris School of Economics.

== Life and career ==
Guesnerie was born in Sainte-Gemmes-le-Robert on 17 February 1943. He studied at École Polytechnique and the École Nationale des Ponts et Chaussées, and received his doctorate in economics from the University of Toulouse in 1982. He taught at the London School of Economics, the École Polytechnique, and at Harvard University. Guesnerie published widely in economics, including in public economics, in the theory of incentives and economic mechanisms, and in the theory of general economic equilibrium.

Guesnerie died in Paris on 4 January 2026, at the age of 82.

=== Honors and responsibilities ===
Guesnerie was elected as president of several scholarly societies, notably the French Association of Economic Sciences (2002–2003), the Econometric Society (1996), and the European Economic Association (1994). Guesnerie was elected as a foreign honorary member of the American Economic Association and as a foreign member of the American Academy of Arts and Sciences. He served as co-editor of Econometrica (1984–1989) and as foreign editor of the Review of Economic Studies. In France, Guesnerie's research has been recognized with the CNRS Silver Medal; he was appointed a knight of the Legion of Honour in 2005 and knight of the Ordre national du Mérite in 1987.

== Publications ==
=== Books ===
- Roger Guesnerie and Henry Tulkens, 2008, The Design of Climate Policy, MIT Press.
- "Assessing Rational Expectations 2: Eductive stability in economics", MIT Press, 2005, 453p.
- "Assessing Rational Expectations: Sunspot multiplicity and economic fluctuations", MIT Press, 2001, 319 p.ISBN 978-0-262-26279-8
- "A contribution to the pure theory of taxation", Cambridge University Press, 1995, 301 pages

=== Papers ===
- Guesnerie, Roger; Roberts, Kevin W.S. (January 1984). "Effective policy tools and quantity controls" (PDF). Econometrica. 52 (1): 59–86. doi:10.2307/1911461. JSTOR 1911461.
- Guesnerie, Roger (1975). "Pareto optimality in non-convex economies". Econometrica. 43 (1): 1–29. doi:10.2307/1913410. JSTOR 1913410. MR 0443877. with "Errata". Econometrica. Vol. 43, no. 5–6. 1975. p. 1010. doi:10.2307/1911353. JSTOR 1911353. MR 0443878.

Donald J. Brown credited Guesnerie's "seminal" paper with the "major methodological innovation in the general equilibrium analysis of firms with pricing rules", "the introduction of the methods of nonsmooth analysis, as a [synthesis] of global analysis (differential topology) and [of] convex analysis." This paper introduced cone of interior displacements of Dubovickii and Miljutin into economics.

- "General equilibrium when Some firms follow special pricing rules", (with Egbert Dierker and W. Neuefeind), Econometrica, 53, 6, 1985

This paper stimulated a subfield of economics, devoted to pricing rules, as discussed by Jacques Drèze:

"Starting with a paper in Econometrica by Dierker, Guesnerie and Neuefeind (1985), a theory of general equilibrium has developed for economies with non-convex production sets, where firms follow well-defined pricing rules. In particular, existence theorems of increasing generality cover (to some extent, because of various differences in assumptions) the case of Ramsey-Boiteux pricing. Those interested primarily in applications might express skepticism, perhaps even horrified skepticism, upon realizing that 90 pages of a serious economics journal—a 1988 issue of The Journal of Mathematical Economics—were devoted to existence proofs of equilibrium in non-convex economies, under alternative formulations of the assumption that marginal cost pricing entails bounded losses at normalized prices. Still, I think that economic research must cover the whole spectrum from concrete applications to that level of abstraction."

- Guesnerie, Roger; Roberts, Kevin W.S. (February–March 1987). "Minimum wage legislation as a second best policy". European Economic Review. 31 (1–2): 490–498. doi:10.1016/0014-2921(87)90067-5.
- Guesnerie, Roger (1989). "First-best allocation of resources with nonconvexities in production". In Cornet, Bernard; Tulkens, Henry (eds.). Contributions to Operations Research and Economics: The twentieth anniversary of CORE (Papers from the symposium held in Louvain-la-Neuve, January 1987). Cambridge, MA: MIT Press. pp. 99–143. ISBN 978-0-262-03149-3. MR 1104662.
