= Ernesto Screpanti =

Italian economist (born 1948)

- Born: 1948 (age 77–78); Rome, Italy
- Known for: Theory of capitalist institutions Global imperialism Value and exploitation theory Libertarian communism Long cycle theory History of economic thought

Academic background
- Education: University of Trento; University of Cambridge
- Influences: Karl Marx; Friedrich Engels; Antonio Gramsci

Academic work
- Institutions: University of Siena; University of Florence; University of Trento; University of Trieste; University of Parma; The New School; Universidade Federal Fluminense
- Notable works: An Outline of the History of Economic Thought; The Fundamental Institutions of Capitalism; Libertarian Communism; Global Imperialism and the Great Crisis; Labour and Value; Liberazione

Ernesto Screpanti (born 1948) is an Italian economist and former professor of political economy at the University of Siena. He is known for his contributions to Marxian economics, the history of economic thought, and the theory of capitalist institutions. His research spans the analysis of capitalist forms, the theory of global imperialism, the reinterpretation of Marxian value theory, and a libertarian reading of communism as a theory of individual freedom. His textbook An Outline of the History of Economic Thought, co-authored with Stefano Zamagni and published by Oxford University Press in two editions, has also appeared in an Italian-language edition published by Carocci.

== Education ==
Screpanti was born in Rome in 1948. He studied sociology at the University of Trento, completing his degree (Laurea) in 1973, and subsequently earned a postgraduate diploma in mathematical techniques for economic research from the Scuola Superiore E. Mattei in Milan in 1975. He then earned a BA and MA in economics at the University of Cambridge in 1977.

== Career ==
Screpanti held teaching and research positions at several universities in Italy and abroad. Over the course of his career, he worked at the University of Trento, the University of Florence, the University of Trieste, and the University of Parma, before settling at the University of Siena, where he served as professor of political economy and professor of the history of political economy. At Siena, he taught courses on the economics of globalization and the theory of justice. He also taught economics at The New School for Social Research in New York and the Universidade Federal Fluminense in Rio de Janeiro.

Screpanti served on the Steering Committee of the European Association for Evolutionary Political Economy (EAEPE) and on the Executive Committee (Comitato Esecutivo) of the Italian Association for the Study of Comparative Economic Systems (AISSEC) during the early 1990s.

Screpanti's research programme has sought to update Marxist analysis in light of contemporary capitalism while freeing it from what he regards as residues of Hegelian metaphysics, Kantian ethics, and economic determinism. He founded the publishing initiative Tedaliber, which distributes books under copyleft licences.

Screpanti's work has appeared in journals including the British Journal of Industrial Relations, the Review of Political Economy, Metroeconomica, and the Review of Radical Political Economics.

== Research ==
=== Theory of capitalist institutions ===
In The Fundamental Institutions of Capitalism (2001), Screpanti argued that the defining institution of capitalism is not private property in the means of production but the employment contract, which he characterised as generating an authority relationship that enables capitalists to subordinate and exploit workers. Drawing on an unpublished chapter of Marx's Capital (the "Results of the Direct Production Process", written 1863–1866), he maintained that the worker's obligation to obedience in the production process, exchanged for a wage, constitutes the core social relation of capitalism. Private property is neither a necessary nor a sufficient condition for capitalism: there are capitalist systems with state-owned enterprises (such as post-war Italian state industry managed through IRI and ENI) and non-capitalist systems that use private property rights in self-managed cooperatives to assign control to workers. Angelo Reati reviewed the book in the Review of Radical Political Economics.

Screpanti proposed a classification of different forms of capitalism by combining three kinds of property rights regimes (concentrated private property, diffused private property, and state property) with four kinds of accumulation governance structures (goods markets, markets for corporate control, external hierarchies, and internal hierarchies). This framework yields five historical forms: classical capitalism, market-oriented corporate capitalism, bank-oriented corporate capitalism, decentralised state capitalism, and centralised state capitalism. He identified the prevailing form in contemporary advanced economies as market-oriented corporate capitalism, characterised by dispersed shareholding, managerial control, and the dominance of financial speculation.

=== Long cycles and class conflict ===
Screpanti has criticised the so-called "laws of movement of capitalist development" as formulated by Marx, on the grounds of their deterministic implications and the analytic limitations of their assumptions. In their place, he advanced a theory of capitalist development as an evolutionary process of a cyclical kind, coupling long-wave and short-run periodicity factors. He argued that both types of cycle are driven by the dynamics of class conflict and income distribution. His 1987 article "Long Cycles in Strike Activity: An Empirical Investigation", published in the British Journal of Industrial Relations, demonstrated statistical regularities in strike activity that corresponded to long-wave economic fluctuations.

=== Theory of global imperialism ===
In Global Imperialism and the Great Crisis (2014), Screpanti formulated a theory of "global imperialism" that defines a governance system of world accumulation fundamentally different from earlier forms of imperialism. He argued that the fundamental imperialist contradiction lies between the centre and the periphery of the global economy, but that there is no single international governance centre; instead, a plurality of national, international, governmental, non-governmental, public, and private agencies contribute to accumulation governance on a world scale through a form of "competitive cooperation". The book traces the 2007–2008 financial crisis to structural tendencies in the global economy, particularly the redistribution of income from labour to capital, which undermined purchasing power and drove the adoption of the financial policies that precipitated the crisis. A review in Choice described the book as offering "a valuable alternative to conventional accounts of the contemporary economy" and recommended it for upper-division undergraduates and above. A review in CounterFire characterised the book as offering "many non-dogmatic critiques of the prevailing neoliberal and imperialist ideology".

An Italian-language version, L'imperialismo globale e la grande crisi: L'incerto futuro del capitalismo, was first published in 2010 and has gone through three editions, the most recent being a revised and expanded third edition published by Tedaliber in 2025.

In the third edition Screpanti introduced important changes. In particular, he argues that global imperialism is structured into an imperial system topped by a hegemonic state (or two), which exercises certain global governance functions that, as public goods serving multinational capital, operate to maintain the dynamics of the world economy in a relative equilibrium. The global governance functions are those of: global sheriff, world banker, engine of global accumulation and scientific–ideological leadership. When an imperial system ceases to work well, because new rival powers emerge and because the dominant power loses the capacity to perform global governance functions, the structure enters a systemic crisis (typically an economic, political and military crisis) that can last a few decades, and from which it emerges with the formation of a new imperial system and a different hegemonic state (or two).

=== Value and exploitation theory ===
In Labour and Value: Rethinking Marx's Theory of Exploitation (2019), Screpanti proposed an interpretation of abstract labour as a social phenomenon rather than a physiological or technological one: it is the labour time of workers who are subordinate and subsumed under capital. He argued that exploitation is made possible by the exercise of command over work in the production process, and that values are best expressed in terms of labour commanded or the monetary value of labour, rather than in terms of labour embodied. Nicholas Vrousalis, reviewing the book in the Erasmus Journal for Philosophy and Economics, described it as "a succinct, lucid, and well-argued book" and endorsed Screpanti's argument that "abstract labour is not a natural or monadic substance ... but a relational property coextensive with the subordination of labour to capital." Bill Jefferies, reviewing the book in the Marx and Philosophy Review of Books, was more critical, arguing that Screpanti's rejection of labour values as a determinant of social relations was untenable.

=== Libertarian communism and the theory of freedom ===
In Libertarian Communism: Marx, Engels and the Political Economy of Freedom (2007), Screpanti advanced a reading of Marx and Engels as libertarian theorists. He defined freedom as the real capacity of individuals to make choices, drawing on Gramsci's approach and enriching it with contemporary theories of freedom of choice, understood as a magnitude determined by the opportunity sets available to individuals. He argued that freedom of choice is unequally distributed under capitalism: it is minimal for workers and maximal for capitalists in the production process, and similarly skewed in the consumption sphere. Communism is therefore understood as a process of historical transformation in which the oppressed and exploited classes struggle for the redistribution of freedom.

Arthur DiQuattro, reviewing the book in the Review of Radical Political Economics, engaged with Screpanti's reconceptualisation of communism as a theory of individual freedom while noting tensions between the libertarian and collectivist strands in the argument. Tom Bunyard reviewed the work in Historical Materialism.

Screpanti further developed this line of thought in articles on the measurement of freedom of choice, progressive taxation and the distribution of freedom, and the comparison of freedom in capitalist and self-managed firms, published in the Review of Political Economy and Metroeconomica.

=== Theory of revolution and liberation ===
In Liberazione: il movimento reale che abolisce lo stato di cose esistenti (2023), Screpanti developed a theory of revolution as a liberation process set in motion by individuals and social aggregates driven by the need for autonomy and the desire to broaden their sets of choice opportunities. The work extends the concept of freedom developed in his earlier book Libertarian Communism into a theory of revolutionary practice as emancipation. A review by D. Micocci in the journal Dialettica&Filosofia engaged with Screpanti's framing of liberation as a historical process driven by the oppressed, while noting the utopian dimensions of his model of social organisation.

=== History of economic thought ===
Screpanti co-authored An Outline of the History of Economic Thought with Stefano Zamagni, first published by Oxford University Press in 1993 with a revised and expanded second edition in 2005. The book provides a comprehensive overview of the development of economics from the late Middle Ages to contemporary developments, tracing the evolution of economic ideas through major thinkers and schools. The book has also been published in an Italian-language edition as Profilo di storia del pensiero economico by Carocci editore.

J. E. King, reviewing the second edition in the History of Economics Review, described it as "scholarly but accessible, comprehensive but manageable" and called it "a generally very good book". Robert W. Dimand, reviewing the first edition in the Marshall Studies Bulletin, described the work as "erudite, thoughtful, and frankly partisan" and recommended it "with enthusiasm to a colleague from another social science or the humanities".

Screpanti also co-edited Rethinking Economics (1991) with Geoffrey M. Hodgson and Pluralism in Economics (1997) with Andrea Salanti, both published by Edward Elgar.

== Selected publications ==
=== Books ===
- An Outline of the History of Economic Thought (with Stefano Zamagni). Oxford: Oxford University Press, 1993; 2nd ed. 2005. ISBN 978-0-19-927914-2.
- Rethinking Economics (edited with Geoffrey M. Hodgson). Aldershot: Edward Elgar, 1991. ISBN 978-1-85278-416-4.
- Pluralism in Economics (edited with Andrea Salanti). Cheltenham: Edward Elgar, 1997. ISBN 978-1-85898-140-6.
- The Fundamental Institutions of Capitalism. London: Routledge, 2001. ISBN 978-0-415-24767-2.
- Libertarian Communism: Marx, Engels and the Political Economy of Freedom. Basingstoke: Palgrave Macmillan, 2007. ISBN 978-0-230-01896-9.
- Global Imperialism and the Great Crisis: The Uncertain Future of Capitalism. New York: Monthly Review Press, 2014. ISBN 978-1-58367-447-5.
- Labour and Value: Rethinking Marx's Theory of Exploitation. Cambridge: Open Book Publishers, 2019. ISBN 978-1-78374-780-1.
- Liberazione: il movimento reale che abolisce lo stato di cose esistente. Firenze: Tedaliber, 2023.
- L'imperialismo globale e la grande crisi: L'incerto futuro del capitalismo. 3rd revised ed. Firenze: Tedaliber, 2025. ISBN 979-8-3192-9319-0.

=== Selected journal articles ===
- "Long Cycles in Strike Activity: An Empirical Investigation". British Journal of Industrial Relations, 25(1): 99–124, 1987.
- "A Pure Insider Theory of Hysteresis in Employment and Unemployment". Review of Radical Political Economics, 28(4): 93–112, 1996.
- "Wages, Employment, and Militancy: A Simple Model and Some Empirical Tests". Review of Radical Political Economics, 32(2): 171–196, 2000.
- "Value and Exploitation: A Counterfactual Approach". Review of Political Economy, 15(2): 155–171, 2003.
- "Taxation, Social Goods and the Distribution of Freedom". Metroeconomica, 57(1): 1–12, 2006.
- "Freedom of Choice in the Production Sphere: The Capitalist and the Self-managed Firm". Review of Political Economy, 23(2): 267–279, 2011.
- "Progressive Taxation and the Distribution of Freedom". Review of Political Economy, 26(4): 618–627, 2014.
