= Insieme =

Insieme (Italian for 'Together') may refer to:

- Together (Italy), a coalition of political parties existing from 2017–2018
- Together (Italy, 2020), a political party founded in 2020
- "Insieme" (song), a 1970 song by Mina
- "Insieme: 1992", a 1990 song by Toto Cutugno
