= Together (Italy, 2020) =

Italian Christian democracy political party

Together Insieme
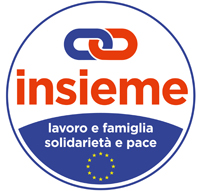
- National Administrative Secretary: Antonio Trapani Lombardo
- Founder: Stefano Zamagni
- Founded: 4 October 2020; 5 years ago
- Headquarters: Via Giosuè Carducci, 4; 00187 Rome
- Ideology: Christian democracy
- Political position: Centre
- National affiliation: Action – Italia Viva (2022–2023)
- Colors: Blue

Website
- insieme-per.it

Together (Italian: Insieme) is a Christian-democratic political party in Italy.

== History ==
The party was founded on 4 October 2020 by the economist Stefano Zamagni, President of the Pontifical Academy of Social Sciences and author of a Manifesto launched in 2019. On 4 July 2021, Eleonora Mosti, Giancarlo Infante and Maurizio Cotta were elected as Secretaries of the party. For the 2022 Italian local elections, the party ran at Lucca and Gorizia, where Together won three seats in the Municipal Council, and one seat in the Genoan Municipal Council.
