= Rubricaire =

Roman waystation

- Robrica; Villa Rupiacus, Rochard; Château de Rubricaire
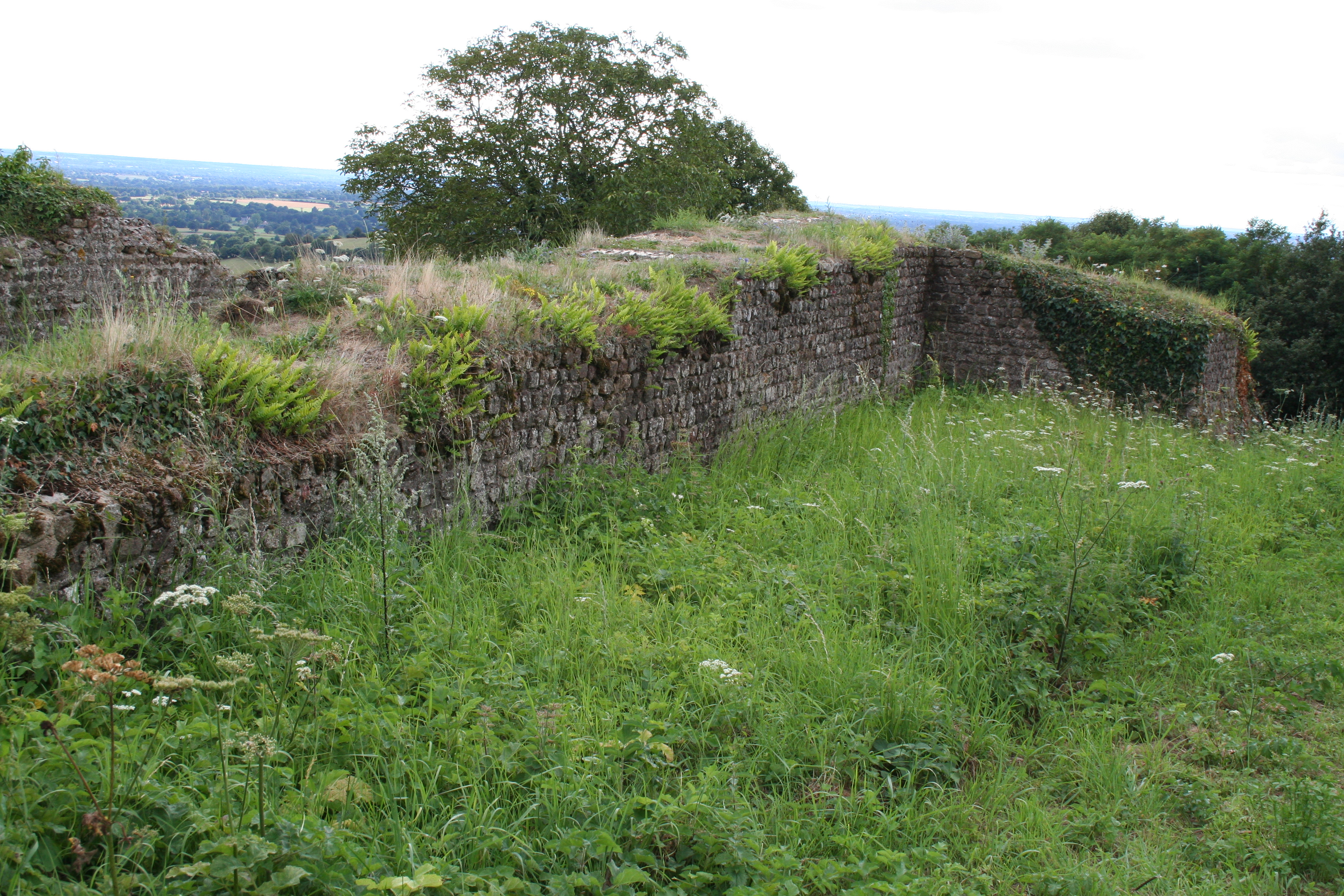
- View of the fort
- Interactive map of Rubricaire
- Type: vicus balneum
- Location: Mayenne, France

History
- Abandoned: 3rd century CE

Site notes
- Archaeologists: Alphonse-Victor Angot; A. Grenier
- Discovered: 1890; 1903

The Roman waystation of Rubricaire in eastern Gaul, the first core of a series of successive settlements that came into being at the foot of Mont Rochard, is better known through its ruins than through historical texts. Also known as the château de Rubricaire, it was the seat of Sainte-Gemmes-le-Robert, in the canton of Évron in (Mayenne), 11 kilometers as the bird flies from, and within sight of, the Jublains archeological site in Mayenne, chief settlement of the Aulerci Diablintes.

Rubricaire has elements of Roman origin: the road, scattered habitations and baths. It is known through a 2nd-century map, recopied in the 11th century.

The Gallo-Roman camp and the balneum of Rubricaire were declared monuments historiques in 1917.

== Identification ==
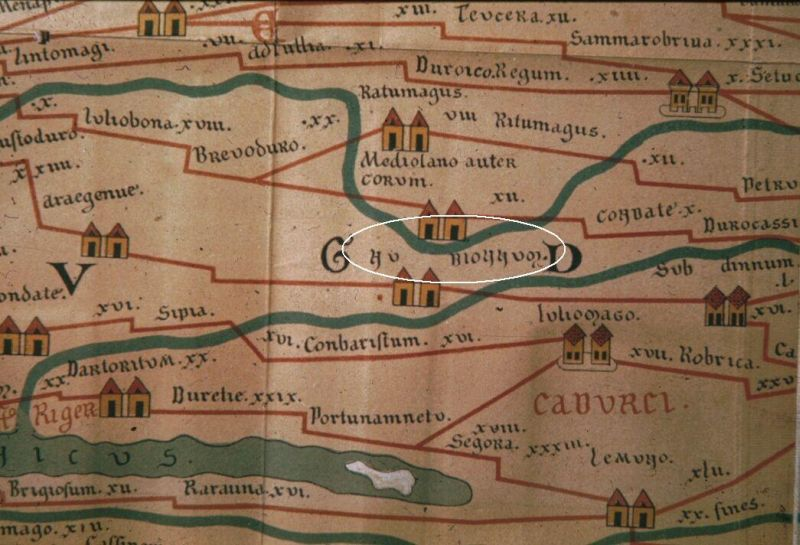
Tabula Peutingeriana

Abbot Alphonse-Victor Angot identified the Rubricaire station on the road from Jublains to Le Mans, as Robrica station on the road from Angers to Le Mans on the Tabula Peutingeriana, first drawn up in the 2nd century, and whose remaining copy dates from the 11th century.

Abbé Angot affirmed:

1. A displacement of only a centimeter on the Tabula Peutingeriana would move the Robrica label from the road to Angers to the one to Jublains;
2. A station has never been found on the road from Angers to Le Mans whose name and distances match the map;
3. because Rubricaire, in the entrenched camp that can still be seen there, even by its name, corresponded at least to two of the elements of the problem and justified the identification that Abbot Angot proposed.

An error by one of the copyists who successively transcribed the text of the map, and who as a group have made errors without number, is plausible, since it would merely consist of displacing a name from one line to the next, parallel and only a centimeter away.

== Roman era (1st-5th centuries) ==
=== Camp ===
Antoine Margerie, pastor of Sainte-Gemme-le-Robert from 1755 to 1776, mentioned the name of Rubricaire in his Mémoire about his parish, addressed around 1770 to canon André René Le Paige, author of the Dictionnaire historique du Maine (Historical dictionary of Maine).

A. Grenier, one of the first to take an archaeological rather than economic or historical approach to the network of Roman roads and relay stations, in his 1934 Manuel de l'archéologie gallo-romaine (Manual of Gallo-Roman Archaeology) described Rubricaire and Jublains as military and fiscal in nature.

Oral tradition had preserved only the name of Rubricaire, but slightly altered, pronounced Rubicaire, whereas the spelling in the priest's Mémoire was "Rubricaire", as M. Gérault also wrote it in his Notice sur Évron (Notice on Évron).

Familiar with the research at Jublains by his pastoral colleagues Pierre Tessier and Lair de la Motte, Margerie well understood the Roman origin of Rubricaire, its relationship to Jublains and its strategic importance. The name Château Rubricaire that he gave it indicates the relatively well-preserved condition of the building, where not only the enclosure of strong walls but also the layout of the housing, could still be distinguished.

=== Excavations ===
In 1834, when the road from Évron to Bais was built, quite a few traces of this building remained, since part of it was demolished for the first layer.

In 1853, the Société française d'archéologie awarded 200 francs to continue the excavations there. But at that time the question of the Arvii had re-arisen, whose capital Vagoritum had since Jean-Baptiste Bourguignon d'Anville been considered to have been at La Cité near Saulges, so the funds were re-allocated there. In 1859, new excavations showed that traces of walls remained.

At the beginning of the 20th century, there remained only two parallel walls to the north, where the principal housing was found, the spur of a buttress in the southwest corner, and around the entire perimeter, instead of walls, a levée of earth and stones enclosing an open space at its center of a dozen ares. The enclosure was acquired on 20 September 1887 through an edict of the Mayenne archaeological commission, which gifted it to the département. It is these earthworks and the space they enclose that are named Rubricaire or, as Margerie wrote, the Château Rubricaire, with neither glebe nor dependency from any fief. Two villages, Les Buttes and Les Jolivières, were established around it. The excavations carried out by Alphonse-Victor Angot in 1903 made it clear that what traditionally had been considered a prison was in fact a balneum.

=== Roman road ===
Rubricaire is a short distance from the road from Jublains to Le Mans, which in crossing the commune of Sainte-Gemme is constantly in view of and seemingly under the watch and protection of the garrison of the fort. Since extrapolating in a straight line would very precisely reach Jublains, there are grounds to believe that this line does not deviate from the path of the road, and runs along the Maisonneuve pond road. The path of the road can still be recognized in a long ungraded road that completely crosses the Vivois stream; in the scattered granite and crumbled sandstone found all along the way; in roads that are often cut off but are easily connected to one another and to other traces. The entirety is a perfectly straight line.

The road was 8 to 9 feet wide and was paved with large blocks of stone solidly assembled on beaten earth and covered with a thick layer of granite, polished sandstone and crushed pebbles.

=== Rural homes ===
Agricultural and artisanal establishments appeared along the road at points that were advantageous for communications with Rubricaire and close to water sources. The traces of several have been located, where can still be seen brick edging and large imported granite stones. Abbot Angot documented the villas that he was able to find.

=== Baths and balneum of Rubricaire ===
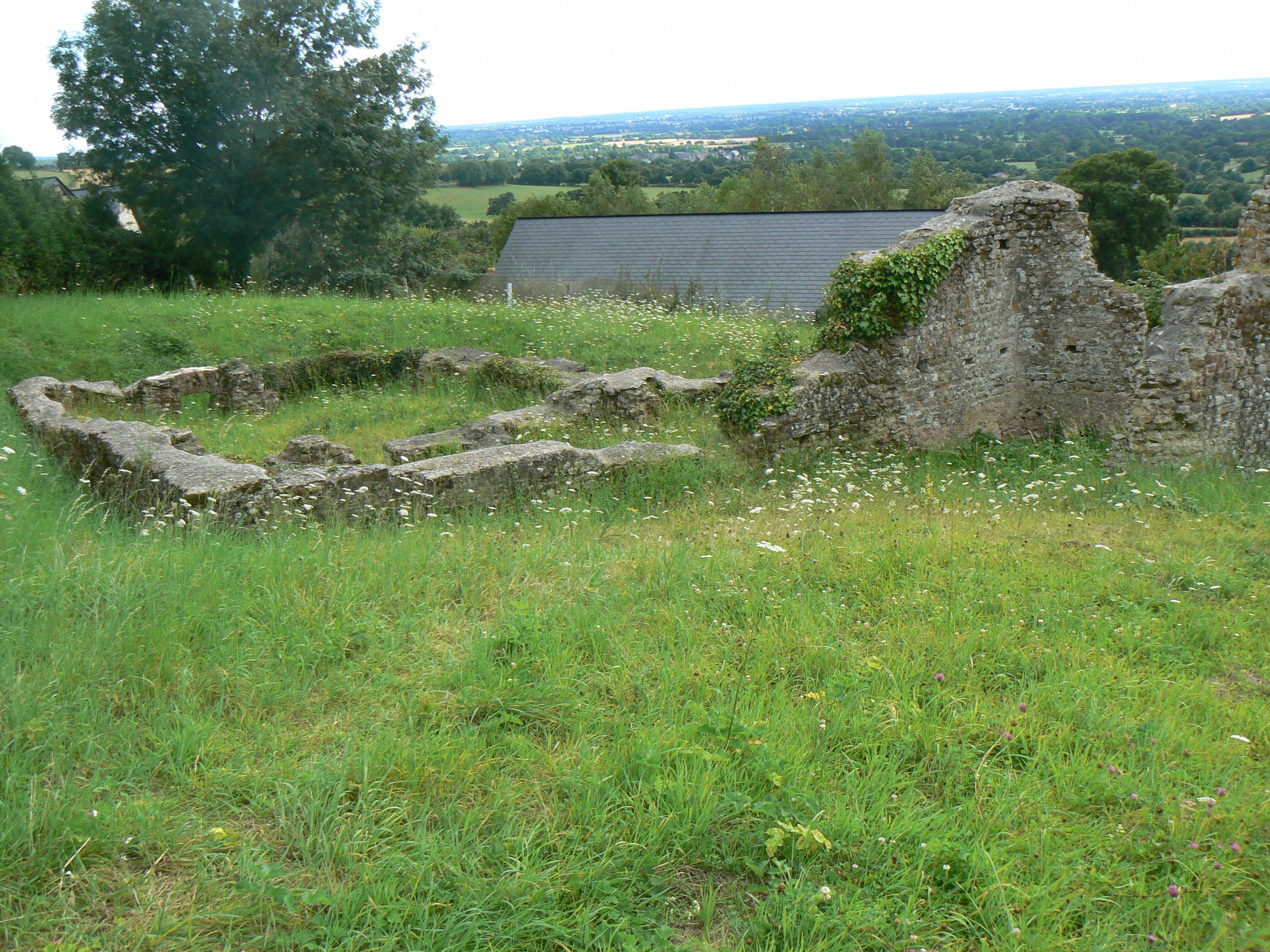
The Rubricaire baths

Rubricaire station disposed for the use of the garrison of a bath establishment with the usual services: cold baths, sauna and hot baths. It was not until around 1890 that they were found and excavated. Their burial preserved them in a condition that allows an examination of all the details of their design, and in some parts the freshness of their plaster and the layout of the conduits for heat and water. It was not until February 1903 that the Abbot Angot undertook his excavations, with the concurrence of the historic commission of Mayenne and the permission of M. Chapelière, the owner of the land.

These baths are outside the enclosure. The whole of the construction has its two longest sides turned to the southwest and the northeast with the corners thus corresponding more or less to the four points of the compass. It includes a rectangular building of 12.50 m by 6.50 m, to which is attached at the western corner an annex, also rectangular, of 4.50 m by 2 m, ending in an apse towards the southwest.

The principal building, also rectangular, included at its northwest edge a section of 4.50 m, attributed, beginning in the northeast, to a ground-level service room, an elevated vestibule over a hypocaust furnace, then to a sauna, also over a hypocaust, in an apse that emerges from the southwest side. One reached the vestibule through a door to the northwest.

The water came from a place 200 meters from Rubricaire, known today as le Châtelier, where the source wells up in ten places and, captured there rather than allowed to follow the natural slope of the terrain, was able to feed the camp as well as its baths.

== Merovingian and Carolingian era ==
=== Garrison of Rubricaire ===
Rubricaire was designed as a fortified camp with a garrison to protect the road and the local settlement. It disappeared along with the Diablintes capital of Jublains towards the end of the third century. A hundred years later, before the end of the 6th century, it was replaced by the villa Rupiacus, Rochard, a vast domain which stretched from ancient Rubricaire to the limits of the territory of Évron (or Aurion), and was assigned along with Jublains to the Roman Catholic Diocese of Le Mans.

=== Possession of the archdiocese of Le Mans ===
By the 6th century at the latest, the parish of Aurion was already established. In 643, Saint Hadoin, bishop of Le Mans, also built an abbey there, with the concurrence of the abbot of Diergé, endowing it with the domains of Jeune, Lémaré, Poilé, Baugé, Diergé near the town and near the church, Assé, Houélé, Châtres, Commer, Aché, and Froidfont.

The author of Actus pontificum Cenomannis, who wrote in the 9th century, was still describing this state of things: possession of Rupiacus by the Bishop of Le Mans, and his jurisdiction over Évron and all of its territory. At the risk of contradicting himself, he added that Rupiacus was given to Saint Hadlin along with twelve good domains by a certain Alain, although elsewhere he attributed its founding to local inhabitants on behalf of Thuribe du Mans in the 3rd century.

Another chronicler also spoke of the villa Rupiacus. He related that Saint Maurus came to Maine to found a Benedictine monastery at the Saint Innocent priory, but did not arrive until after the death of the sainted bishop around 559, and therefore had to go instead to the Duchy of Anjou to set up a different establishment there. His monks consoled themselves by saying that the Rupiacus location in Maine that had been intended for them could only, based on its name, have been a desolate and rocky location.

The author of Actus pontificum Cenomannis, speaking of events closer to his time, reported that in 771, 796 and 802 Charlemagne had the villa Rupiacus returned to Le Mans and to its chapter, then confirmed their possession of it, which a corrupt prelate had appropriated. According to the Actes authentiques (Authentic Acts) of Aldric of Le Mans, bishop from 832 to 857, he gave himself the task of enhancing his domain of Rupiacus, Rochard. Louis the Pious confirmed his possession of it and the parish of Sainte-Gemme was soon founded there.

The name Rupiacus is found only once in the Annales de l'Église du Mans (Annals of the Church of Le Mans), but it is for a significant event. Around 892, Gontier, bishop of Le Mans, successor to Saint Aldric, found himself the subject of harassment by a certain Roger, Count of Maine, correctly believed, according to Abbot Angot, to have been one of the first counts of Maine, but whom the biography of the bishop describes as a tyrant who sacked the episcopal domain of Rupiacus. Le Mans was then the next prey of this bandit. Gontier fled and came to put his domain of Rochard in order. He remained there until Easter, when he went back to Le Mans to perform the ceremonies. His stay in his château de Rochard seems to have been of several months' duration.

Abbot Angot did not hesitate to attribute to Rochard of Sainte-Gemme all texts where Rupiacus was mentioned. He indicated that some have applied some of these to the Roches-l'Évêque. But according to him, nothing indicates this change, and he is certain that "Rupiacus" designates Rochard in the texts about Évron. This name is also very rare and is not encountered in other texts.

=== Country house ===
What became of Rubricaire and the establishments that had surrounded it since the Romans vanished? What became of the entire territory of Rupiacus? Abbot Angot has indicated that all of it belonged to the bishop of Le Mans, that he created a parish and an abbey in the southern part of the domain and retained possession of the northern region, where stood Rochard, and Rubricaire, and where the Romans had had their farmhouses.

Now, with the disappearance of the first occupants, others came to lodge in their dwellings. These were Merovingian and Carolingian Franks. In Roman constructions, artisanal traces of newcomers have been found, especially in the ruins of the farms of Saint Aldric, Bishop Gontier, and their successors through to the 12th century.

Rubricaire, the bishop's country house, was probably destroyed by Herbert I, Count of Maine, based on the traces that have been found of burnt wood, scattered bones, iron from javelins and pikes, and coins issued by the count. This is where Gontier fled to from his enemy and rebuilt the ruins that his enemy had left there. This new preoccupation was so focused that it motivated a shift of the Roman road, which left the flats of Les Rabries for a new trajectory through Étivau, Villeneuve and Richebourg, all names from the Frankish era, all notable places where the passage of the road is clearly marked.

The villa du Fourneau, whose foundations lie beneath the walls of the community school, shows traces of its successive Roman and Frank occupations. La Bouverie, whose ruins were taken to be those of a château or a church, existed in 1850, and similarly had many edging bricks, which were small and made differently than those in the Roman construction, cut with a knife on the lower side. Richefour, where the same type of brick has been found along with a fragment of a grinding wheel, and Vivoin alongside the Roman road, also belong to both the Roman and Frankish periods.

But apart from the Roman foundations that they appropriated and used for themselves, the Franks created other settlements of their own:

- La Butte and La Menéteuse in the champ du Grès occupied no less than two hectares on the road to Évron, where granite and brick were both abundant;
- La Civardière, where poorly-fired bricks were found, and slate into which concentric circles and a small cross had been carved;
- La Foucherie, with large slabs and crumbled bricks, and
- the small settlement at Pezereul, of which only the name is known.

These farms, created by the bishops of Le Mans, were expressly mentioned in the Actes of Aldric of Le Mans and were not to the south of the villa Rupiacus, occupied by the parish of Évron, but in the territory of the parish of Sainte-Gemme, not yet founded at the time, but soon to be.

== Parish of Sainte-Gemme ==
In summary Sainte-Gemme, under the name of Rubricaire, was in the 2nd and 3rd centuries the most important Roman post in the territory of the Diablintes, after Jublains, their capital, and with its villas, known and unknown, grouped around the fortress, it represented, after the Gallo-Roman capital, the largest agglomeration of the territory. If there were elsewhere solidly-built villas of dressed masonry, they were rare and scattered, or did not leave any traces.

The Roman Empire remained in the region until the end of the 3rd century.

The area then took, or more precisely, took back the name of Rupiacus, a villa as vast as the mountain it is named for is high and as important as the fortress that remained its center, including within its limits the territory of Évron. Merovingians then Carolingians inhabited it; the bishop was its eminent owner; he founded Évron in the 6th century, a powerful abbey in the 7th century; farms belonging to the bishop or the faithful multiplied in the region.

Despite these proofs of population in the Frankish era in the canton of Rochard, there was nonetheless as yet no parish in the 8th and 9th centuries. Nor is there, as at Jublains, any Merovingian sepultures. It was not until the 10th century that a church was founded, no doubt by the bishop of Le Mans, dedicated to Saint Gemme.

Thus the historical periods were:

- Rubricaire, Roman waystation;
- Rochard, episcopal villa;
- Sainte-Gemme, parish.
