= The New Palgrave Dictionary of Economics =

Specialist encyclopedia

- Publisher: Palgrave Macmillan
- Publication date: 1987
- ISBN: 0935859101

The New Palgrave Dictionary of Economics (2018), 3rd ed., is a twenty-volume reference work on economics published by Palgrave Macmillan. It contains around 3,000 entries, including many classic essays from the original Inglis Palgrave Dictionary, and a significant increase in new entries from the previous editions by the most prominent economists in the field, among them 36 winners of the Sveriges Riksbank Prize in Economic Sciences in Memory of Alfred Nobel. Articles are classified according to Journal of Economic Literature (JEL) classification codes.

The New Palgrave is also available in a hyperlinked online version. Online content is added to the 2018 edition, and a 4th edition under the editorship of Jayati Ghosh, Esteban Pérez Caldentey, and Matías Vernengo will be published in 2027. J. Barkley Rosser Jr. was a co-editor until his untimely demise. The 1st edition was titled The New Palgrave: A Dictionary of Economics (1987), was and edited by John Eatwell, Murray Milgate, and Peter Newman, as a way of recovering the legacy of Inglis Palgrave famous dictionary. It was published in four volumes, while the 2nd edition was under the direction of Steven N. Durlauf and Lawrence E. Blume and was published in eight volumes. Both are discussed in a section below.

Access to full-text articles (for all editions and post-2018 updates) are available online by subscription, whether of an organization, a person, or a person through an organization.

== The New Palgrave: A Dictionary of Economics ==
The New Palgrave: A Dictionary of Economics (1987) is the title of the first New Palgrave edition. It is a four-volume reference edited by John Eatwell, Murray Milgate, and Peter Newman. It has 4,000 pages of entries, including 1,300 subject entries (with 4,000 cross-references), and 655 biographies. There were 927 contributors, including 13 Nobel Laureates in Economics at the time of first publication. It includes about 50 articles from Palgrave's Dictionary of Political Economy (1925–1927). It was roughly twice the length of its predecessor and differed further in excluding most subjects not on economics or closely related to its practice. It was developed as a modern version of the old Inglis Palgrave dictionary, with entries written by prominent economists for a highly specialized public.

=== Reviews ===
==== General remarks ====
Reviewing the 1987 edition for the New York Times, Robert M. Solow concluded that "this is a dictionary only in a very special sense. There are excellent survey articles, in various sizes, on various subjects. But the best of them are written by professionals for professionals." According to Solow, graduate students in economics would find the dictionary useful, but most of the articles would be inaccessible to non-economists, even undergraduate students of the liberal arts. For economists, however, the dictionary provided many excellent overviews of contemporary research. In response, editor Milgate (1992) confirmed that the articles were written for an audience of professional economists, and so neither for the general reading public nor for specialist economists.

==== Mathematics and contemporary economics ====
According to Milgate, New Palgrave downplayed mathematics, in comparison to leading economic journals. Only 24% of the columns contained "any mathematics" (and so required expensive hand-typesetting), while only 25% of the most recent issue of the American Economic Review (AER) in fact lacked mathematics, according to Milgate, who averred that the AER's mathematical usage was typical of leading contemporary journals: The New Palgrave's usage of mathematics was the reciprocal of the contemporary profession's. (Milgate 1992, p. 299) "It must be concluded that the New Palgrave actually under-represented the mathematical element in modern economics; and under-represented it to a significant degree", wrote Milgate (1992, p. 300).

Commenting on contemporary economics, Solow described technical economics as its essential "infrastructure":

There is a lesson in the fate of Palgrave. Economics is no longer a fit conversation piece for ladies and gentlemen. It has become a technical subject. Like any technical subject it attracts some people who are more interested in the technique than the subject. That is too bad, but it may be inevitable. In any case, do not kid yourself: the technical core of economics is indispensable infrastructure for the political economy. That is why, if you consult Palgrave looking for enlightenment about the world today, you will be led to technical economics, or history, or nothing at all.

More advanced mathematics was implicit in some of the articles, many of which were well written and reasonably accessible. Solow recommended the "broad and deep" article on game theory by Robert J. Aumann for well-equipped graduate students, along with John Harsanyi's article on bargaining theory. The articles on financial economics were "written by the best people—Stephen Ross, Robert Merton, and others—and they show it"; however, they were too difficult for the average investor. Complimenting the article on international trade, Solow added a caveat lector: "But God forbid that" a reader without knowledge of economics should try to understand protectionism, by consulting the New Palgrave.

In his review, George Stigler commended the dictionary's non-technical and conceptually rich article on social choice, which was written by Kenneth Arrow, among "numerous" excellent articles. However, Stigler criticized the inclusion of "dozens" of articles in mathematical economics, which failed to provide intuitive introductions to the problem, how it was solved, and what the solution is: "These articles were written, not for a tolerably competent economist, but exclusively for fellow specialists."

==== Exclusion of empirical material ====
Whitaker wrote, "Readers to whom economics is nothing if not a science based on empirical inquiry may be dismayed by the lack of attention to empirical studies and factual matters".

Stigler criticized the New Palgrave for largely ignoring empirical economics—economic data, summary statistics, and econometric investigations. According to Stigler, the empirical investigation of consumption and production functions has profoundly influenced microeconomic theory, while the empirical investigation of price levels has profoundly influenced monetary economics: The New Palgrave's neglect of empirical economics also weakened its treatment of economic theory and the history of economic thought. Furthermore, the editors failed to explain their neglect of empirical economics, while they gave large space to treatments of "technical economics", especially mathematical economics, and faddish topics, wrote Stigler.

"The article on 'Profit and profit theory' does not contain a single number for what profits are or ever have been, in the United States or any other country, or any reference to any source that might provide such a number", wrote Herbert Stein, who complained "There are articles about elasticities of this or that but no estimate of the elasticity of anything."

Reviewing the critics of the over-emphasis on theoretical and "doctrinal" economics, editor Milgate admitted that the New Palgrave was flawed by its neglect of empirical economics.

==== Criticisms of undue weight for heterodox approaches ====
Robert M. Solow criticized the 1987 edition for slighting mainstream economics by giving excessive space to the "dissenting fringes within academic economics", namely Marxist economics as well as "Austrian persuasion", Post-Keynesians, and neo-Ricardian.

Nevertheless, there is usually a definite consensus—there is one now—and an accurate picture of the discipline would make that clear. It would have to give dissent a fair shake. It would have to treat mainstream ideas critically. But it should keep the various "paradigms" in proportion. I do not think The New Palgrave has managed to do that.

The most obvious, though not the most important, manifestation of imbalance is the large number of items devoted to Marxist themes, from "abstract and concrete labor" to "vulgar economy." Some of the articles are informative, some are mystifying; but that is not the point. Marx was an important and influential thinker, and Marxism has been a doctrine with intellectual and practical influence. The fact is, however, that most serious English-speaking economists regard Marxist economics as an irrelevant dead end. The New Palgrave does not take up the issue head on, but I think it gives a false impression of the state of play by this deadpan statement. It is rather as if a medical dictionary were to intersperse articles on mainstream orthopedics, written by orthopedists, with articles on osteopathy, written by osteopaths, and were to leave it at that.

The 1987 dictionary's discussion of heterodox approaches was also criticized by George Stigler, who complained that these articles were written by sympathetic editors in a partisan manner:

The selection of sympathetic writers ... is in fact a general practice in Palgrave II. Israel Kirzner's essay on the Austrian economists does not hint at the existence of error, misrepresentation of critics, or tasteless attacks upon the German Historical School, and Klaus Henning (sic.) did little better with Böhm-Bawerk. An ersatz Austrian is apparently more loyal than the genuine article. [Italics added]

Stigler complained about the extensive and biased articles on Marxist economics, including "neo-Ricardian" economists (who follow Piero Sraffa): "A nonprofessional reader would never guess from these volumes that economists working in the Marxian-Sraffian tradition represent a small minority of modern economists, and that their writings have virtually no impact upon the professional work of most economists in major English-language universities." Stigler provided a table of articles that were biased by Marxist orthodoxy and also criticized some authors by name, especially a "violently pro-Marxist" entry by C. B. Macpherson on individualism.

== The 2nd edition (2008) ==
The General Editors were Steven N. Durlauf and Lawrence E. Blume. It added considerably on the previous edition, and maintained the general conception of the dictionary as written for advanced specialists. The list of Nobel laureates increased to 25, and the number of volumes also doubled. Perhaps as a result of already being an established institution there were a considerably smaller number of reviews. Declan Trott argued that the Dictionary is not properly a dictionary or an encyclopedia and that the quality and depth of the entries are very uneven, comparing it with Wikipedia as a source for information on economics.

== Earlier editions ==
R. H. Inglis Palgrave's Dictionary of Political Economy (1894–1899), 3 v., was the forerunner of The New Palgrave. The initial contractual agreement between Palgrave and the publisher Macmillan & Co. is dated 1888. Serial installments in 1891–92 had disappointing sales. An appendix was added to Volume III in 1908, so completing publication of the set. The Dictionary was wide-ranging and sometimes idiosyncratic. It included for example a comprehensive treatment of laws on property and commercial transactions. Professional reaction has been described as generally favorable and unsurprising, "given that almost all economists of any repute had already endorsed the enterprise by agreeing to contribute." Nearly thirty years after the first volume appeared, Palgrave's Dictionary of Political Economy (1923–1926), edited by Henry Higgs, appeared with Palgrave's name added to the title but few changes in structure or contents.

== See also ==
- Concise Encyclopedia of Economics
- Economics handbooks
- International Encyclopedia of the Social & Behavioral Sciences
- List of encyclopedias by branch of knowledge
