= Diana Coole =

British political theorist

Diana Hilary Coole
- Born: 1952 (age 73–74)
- Scientific career
- Institutions: Birkbeck, University of London Department of Politics

Diana Hilary Coole (born 1952) is Professor of Political and Social Theory in the School of Politics and Sociology, Birkbeck, University of London. Her main field of research covers, broadly, contemporary continental philosophy with special interests in poststructuralism (especially Foucault), and feminism and gender in political thought. Coole also sits on the editorial boards of several journals including Contemporary Political Theory and the European Journal of Political Theory.

== Publications ==
- Coole, Diana H. (1993). Women in political theory: from ancient misogyny to contemporary feminism. Hemel Hempstead: Harvester Wheatsheaf. ISBN 9780745011455.
- Coole, Diana H. (2000). Negativity and politics Dionysus and dialectics from Kant to poststructuralism. London New York: Routledge. ISBN 0415031761.
- Coole, Diana H. (2007). Merleau-Ponty and modern politics after anti-humanism. Lanham, Maryland: Rowman & Littlefield Publishers, Inc. ISBN 9780742533387.
- Coole, Diana H.; Frost, Samantha (Eds) (2010). New materialisms: ontology, agency, and politics. Durham North Carolina London: Duke University Press. ISBN 9780822347729.
- Coole, Diana H.; Gibbons, Michael; Ellis, Elisabeth; Ferguson, Kennan (2014). The encyclopedia of political thought, 8 volume set. Chichester, West Sussex, UK Malden, Massachusetts: Wiley-Blackwell. ISBN 9781405191296.

== See also ==
- Michel Foucault
- Immanuel Kant
- Maurice Merleau-Ponty
- Materialism (economic)
- Ontology
- Phenomenology
- Political philosophy
- Poststructuralism
