= Lawrence E. Blume =

American economist

Academic background
- Education: Professor
- Alma mater: Washington University in St. Louis & University of California, Berkeley

Academic work
- Discipline: Economics
- Sub-discipline: Econometric
- Institutions: Cornell University

Lawrence E. Blume is the Kenneth O. Reed Professor of Economics and Professor of Information Science at Cornell University, US.

== Education ==
A Fellow of the Econometric Society, he received a BA in economics from Washington University in St. Louis and a PhD in economics from the University of California, Berkeley.

== Academic career ==
He is a visiting research professor at IHS Vienna. He has been a member of the external faculty at the Santa Fe Institute, where he served as co-director of the economics program and on the institute's steering committee. He was formerly an associate professor of economics at the University Michigan. He teaches and conducts research in general equilibrium theory and game theory, and also has research projects on social networks, growth theory, and evolutionary processes in markets and games.

Blume was one of the general editors of The New Palgrave Dictionary of Economics, to which he contributed several articles on mathematical economics: Convexity, convex programming, and duality. He was previously the associate editor of the Journal of Economic Literature. He is the co-author with Carl P. Simon of Mathematics for Economists.

== Selected publications ==
- Simon, Carl P.; Blume, Lawrence (1994). Mathematics for Economists. Norton.
- Blume, Lawrence E. (2008b). "Convex programming". In Durlauf, Steven N.; Blume, Lawrence E (eds.). The New Palgrave Dictionary of Economics (Second ed.). Palgrave Macmillan. pp. 220–225. doi:10.1057/9780230226203.0314. ISBN 978-0-333-78676-5.
- Blume, Lawrence E. (2008c). "Convexity". In Durlauf, Steven N.; Blume, Lawrence E (eds.). The New Palgrave Dictionary of Economics (Second ed.). Palgrave Macmillan. pp. 225–226. doi:10.1057/9780230226203.0315. ISBN 978-0-333-78676-5.
- Blume, Lawrence E. (2008d). "Duality". In Durlauf, Steven N.; Blume, Lawrence E (eds.). The New Palgrave Dictionary of Economics (Second ed.). Palgrave Macmillan. pp. 551–555. doi:10.1057/9780230226203.0411. ISBN 978-0-333-78676-5.
