= European Journal of Political Theory =

- Discipline: Political theory and philosophy
- Language: English
- Edited by: Enzo Rossi, Robin Douglass

Publication details
- History: 2002–present
- Publisher: SAGE Publications
- Frequency: Quarterly
- Impact factor: 0.437 (2014)

Standard abbreviations
- ISO 4: Eur. J. Political Theory

Indexing
- ISSN: 1474-8851 (print); 1741-2730 (web)
- LCCN: 2003203027
- OCLC no.: 300290660

Links
- Journal homepage; Online access; Online archive

The European Journal of Political Theory is a quarterly peer-reviewed academic journal that covers the field of political theory and philosophy. The editors-in-chief are Enzo Rossi (University of Amsterdam) and Robin Douglass (King's College London). It was established in 2002 and is published by SAGE Publications.

== Abstracting and indexing ==
The journal is abstracted and indexed in Current Contents/Social and Behavioral Sciences, Scopus, and Worldwide Political Science Abstracts.
