= Eni (disambiguation) =

Eni is an Italian oil and gas corporation.

Eni or ENI may refer to:

== Businesses and organisations ==
- Escuela Nacional de Inteligencia, the Argentine intelligence academy
- Groupe des écoles nationales d’ingénieurs (Groupe ENI), a French engineering school network

== People ==
- Eni of East Anglia, 7th-century Anglo-Saxon royal
- Eni Faleomavaega (1943–2017), American Samoan politician
- Eni Gesinde (born 1982), Nigerian footballer
- Eni Imami (born 1992), Albanian footballer
- Eni Llazani (born 1989), Albanian basketball player
- Eni Njoku (1917–1974), Nigerian botanist and educator
- Oshrat Eni (born 1984), Israeli footballer

== Other uses ==
- E.N.I. (band), a Croatian pop band
- Eni (letter), a letter of the Georgian scripts
- ENI number, a registration for ships in Europe
- El Nido Airport (IATA code: ENI), in the Philippines
- European Neighbourhood Instrument, a European Union policy

== See also ==
- Ani Rural District, Iran
