= Sainte-Gemmes-le-Robert =

- Commune
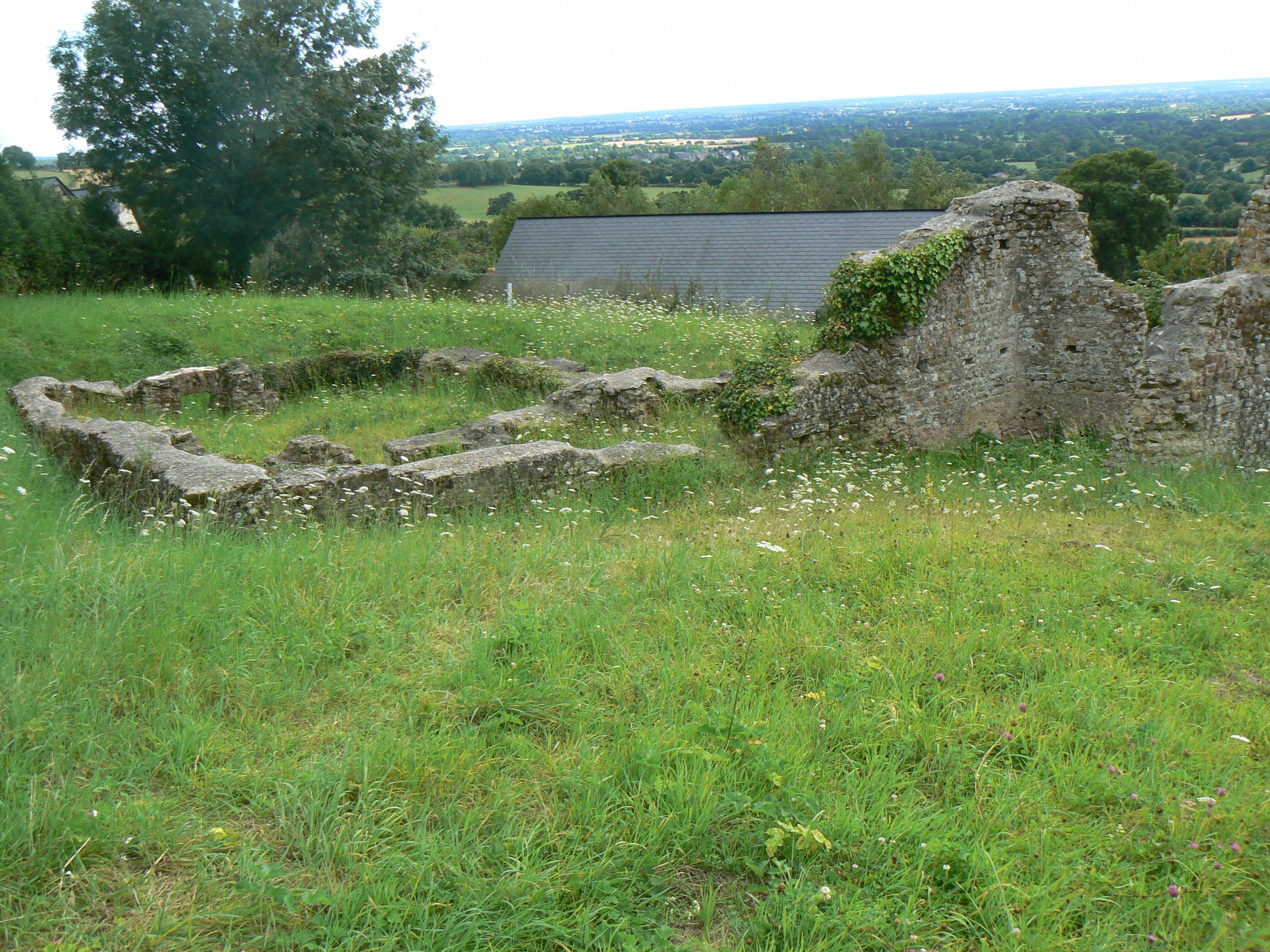
- The ruins of the Roman baths at Rubricaire

- Coat of arms
- Location of Sainte-Gemmes-le-Robert
- Location within France Location within Pays de la Loire
- Coordinates: 48°11′56″N 0°22′15″W
- Country: France
- Region: Pays de la Loire
- Department: Mayenne
- Arrondissement: Mayenne
- Canton: Évron
- Intercommunality: CC des Coëvrons

Government
  - Mayor (2020–2026): Bernard Moullé
- Area^{1}: 35.62 km^{2} (13.75 sq mi)
- Elevation: 137 m (449 ft)
- Highest elevation: 357 m (1,171 ft)
- Lowest elevation: 99 m (325 ft)
- Population (2023): 773
  - Density: 21.7/km^{2} (56.2/sq mi)
- Time zone: UTC+01:00 (CET)
  - Summer (DST): UTC+02:00 (CEST)
- INSEE/Postal code: 53218 /53600
- ^{1} French Land Register data, which excludes lakes, ponds, glaciers > 1 km^{2} (0.386 sq mi or 247 acres) and river estuaries.

Sainte-Gemmes-le-Robert (French pronunciation: [sɛ̃t ʒɛm lə ʁɔbɛʁ]) is a commune in the Mayenne department in north-western France.

== See also ==
- Communes of Mayenne
