= James T. Kloppenberg =

American historian (born 1951)

- Born: June 23, 1951 (age 75); Denver, Colorado, United States
- Occupations: Historian; professor
- Spouse: Mary

James T. Kloppenberg (born June 23, 1951, in Denver) is an American historian, and Charles Warren Professor of American History, at Harvard University.

== Life ==
He graduated from Dartmouth College summa cum laude, and from Stanford University with an M.A. and Ph.D. in 1980. He has held the Pitt professorship at the University of Cambridge, has taught at the École des hautes études en sciences sociales in Paris, and has taught at Brandeis University.

Kloppenberg is Catholic. He and his wife Mary live in Wellesley, Massachusetts.

== Awards ==
- 1978–1980 Danforth Fellowship
- 1978–1979 Whiting Fellowship
- 1991 Guggenheim Fellowship
- 1982–1983 American Council of Learned Societies Fellowship
- 1987 Merle Curti Award
- 1999–2000 National Endowment for the Humanities Fellowship

== Works ==
- "Institutionalism, Rational Choice and Historical Analysis", Polity, Vol. 28, No. 1 (Autumn, 1995), pp. 125–128

=== Chapters ===
- Ronald G. Walters, ed. (1997). "Why History Matters to Political Theory". Scientific authority & twentieth-century America. JHU Press. ISBN 978-0-8018-5390-6.
- John Pettegrew, ed. (2000). "Pragmatism: An Old Name for Some New Ways of Thinking". A pragmatist's progress?: Richard Rorty and American intellectual history. Rowman & Littlefield. ISBN 978-0-8476-9062-6.
- Bart Schultz, ed. (2002). "Rethinking Tradition: Sidgwick and the philosophy of the via media". Essays on Henry Sidgwick. Cambridge University Press. ISBN 978-0-521-89304-6.
- Melvyn Stokes, ed. (2002). "Intellectual History, Democracy and the Culture of Irony". The state of U.S. history. Berg Publishers. ISBN 978-1-85973-502-2.
- Jack P. Greene; J. R. Pole, eds. (2003). "Virtue". A Companion to the American Revolution. Wiley-Blackwell. ISBN 978-1-4051-1674-9.
- Meg Jacobs; William J. Novak; Julian E. Zelizer, eds. (2003). "From Hartz to Tocqueville". The democratic experiment: new directions in American political history. Princeton University Press. ISBN 978-0-691-11377-7.
- Robert Laurence Moore; Maurizio Vaudagna, eds. (2003). "American Democracy and the Welfare State". The American century in Europe. Cornell University Press. p. 195. ISBN 978-0-8014-4075-5.
- David E. Barclay; Elisabeth Glaser-Schmidt, eds. (2003). "The Reciprocal Visions of German and American Intellectuals". Transatlantic Images and Perceptions: Germany and America Since 1776. Cambridge University Press. ISBN 978-0-521-53442-0.
- William M. Shea; Peter A. Huff, eds. (2003). "Knowledge and Belief in American Public Life". Knowledge and Belief in America: Enlightenment Traditions and Modern Religious Thought. Cambridge University Press. ISBN 978-0-521-53328-7.
- David A. Hollinger, ed. (2006). "The Place of Value in a Culture of Facts". The humanities and the dynamics of inclusion since World War II. JHU Press. ISBN 978-0-8018-8390-3.

=== Bibliography ===
- Uncertain Victory: Social Democracy and Progressivism in European and American Thought, 1870-1920. Oxford University Press. 1986. ISBN 978-0-19-505304-3.
- Richard Wightman Fox; James T. Kloppenberg, eds. (1995). A Companion to American Thought. Blackwell. ISBN 978-0-631-20656-9.
- The Virtues of Liberalism. Oxford University Press. 1998. ISBN 978-0-19-514056-9.
- Reading Obama: Dreams, Hopes, and the American Political Tradition (2010 Princeton University Press). ISBN 0-691-14746-9
- The Worlds of American Intellectual History (2016 Oxford University Press) with Joel Isaac, Michael O'Brien, and Jennifer Ratner-Rosenhagen
- Toward Democracy: The Struggle for Self-Rule in European and American Thought (2016 Oxford University Press)
