= Murray Milgate =

Australian-born academic economist

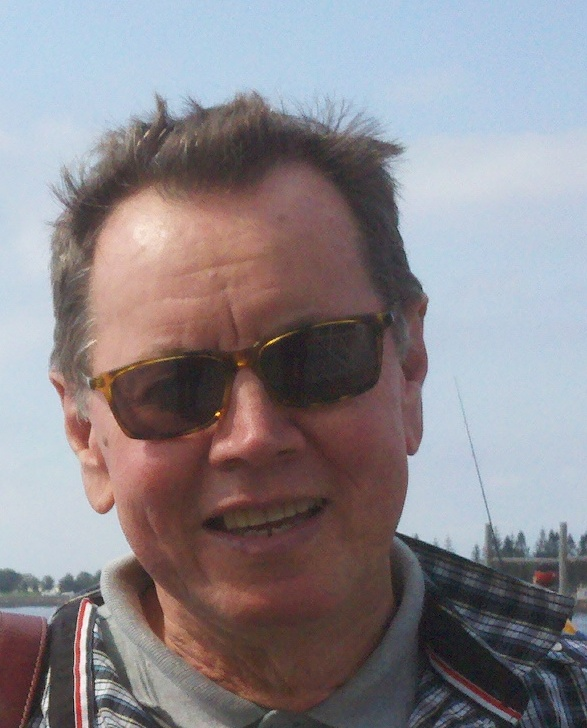
- Born: 1950 (age 75–76)

Academic background
- Education: University of Cambridge
- Thesis: Capital and Employment: A Re-examination of the Nature of Keynes' Departure from Orthodox Economic Analysis and of Its Relationship to the Classical Economists (1980)

Academic work
- Discipline: Economist
- Institutions: University of Cambridge
- Awards: Eccles Prize for Excellence in Economic Writing; David and Elaine Spitz Prize

Murray Milgate (born 1950), is an Australian-born academic economist and Sometime Fellow and director of studies in economics at Queens' College, Cambridge, where he is now a Life Fellow. He is the co-creator and co-editor of the celebrated original edition of The New Palgrave Dictionary of Economics (1987) together with John Eatwell and Peter Newman.

== Biography ==
Milgate was educated at the University of Sydney, where he was a student of Peter D. Groenewegen, and at the University of Cambridge, where he completed his PhD on John Maynard Keynes's economics in 1980, influenced by Piero Sraffa's rehabilitation of the classical economists and Karl Marx. He then taught economics at Cambridge and Sydney before moving to Harvard University in 1984. He returned to Cambridge in 1996.

He was a visiting professor at the University of California at Berkeley (1992) and was made distinguished visiting professor of economics at Osaka Gakuin University in Japan in 2008. He is a founding editor of the journal Contributions to Political Economy.

Working in the Keynesian tradition, he is best known for his contributions to the dissemination of economic knowledge through his New Palgrave activities and his published writings that focus on exploring: (1) the relation between classical economic theory and Keynesian economics as an alternative to standard neoclassical thinking about the market mechanism; (2) the history of nineteenth-century political economy. An assessment of aspects of the first set of contributions can be found in Dutt and Amadeo's Keynes's Third Alternative.

In 1992 Milgate shared the Eccles Prize for Excellence in Economic Writing (from Columbia University Business School) for the New Palgrave Dictionary of Money and Finance and in 1995 The New Palgrave World of Economics was named among the 100 most influential books since WW2 by the Central and Eastern European Publishing Project (CEEPP) at the University of Oxford. In 2011 his After Adam Smith was awarded the David and Elaine Spitz Prize for the best book on liberal and democratic theory by the International Conference for the Study of Political Thought.

== Selected bibliography ==
This is a list of some of Milgate's major works.

=== Books ===
- Milgate, Murray (1982). Capital and employment: a study of Keynes's economics. London: Academic Press. ISBN 9780124962507.
- Milgate, Murray; Eatwell, John (1983). Keynes's economics and the theory of value and distribution. London: Duckworth. ISBN 9780715617496.
- Milgate, Murray; Eatwell, John; Newman, Peter K. (1987). The New Palgrave: a dictionary of economics. London: Macmillan. ISBN 9780333740408.
- Milgate, Murray; Eatwell, John; Newman, Peter K. (1989). The New Palgrave: allocation, information, and markets. New York: Norton. ISBN 9780393958546.
- Milgate, Murray; Eatwell, John; Newman, Peter K. (1990). The New Palgrave: capital theory. New York: Norton. ISBN 9780393958553.
- Milgate, Murray; Welch, Cheryl B. (1989). Critical issues in social thought. London: Academic Press. ISBN 9780124962484.
- Milgate, Murray; Stimson, Shannon C. (1991). Ricardian politics. Princeton, New Jersey: Princeton University Press. ISBN 9780691042787.
- Milgate, Murray; Eatwell, John; Newman, Peter K. (1992). The new Palgrave dictionary of money & finance (3 volume set). London: Macmillan Press. ISBN 9780333527221.
- Milgate, Murray; Stimson, Shannon C. (2011). After Adam Smith: a century of transformation in politics and political economy. Princeton, New Jersey: Princeton University Press. ISBN 9780691152349.
- Milgate, Murray; Eatwell, John (2011). The fall and rise of Keynesian economics. New York: Oxford University Press. ISBN 9780199777693.

=== Journal articles ===
- Milgate, Murray; Eatwell, John (1988). "Economic theory and European society: the influence of J.M. Keynes". History of European Ideas. 9 (2): 215–225. doi:10.1016/0191-6599(88)90042-3.
