= Peter Kenneth Newman =

Peter Newman
- Born: Peter Kenneth Newman; 5 October 1928; Mitcham, Surrey, UK
- Died: 6 November 2001 (aged 73)

Academic work
- Discipline: Economist

Peter Kenneth Newman (5 October 1928, Mitcham, Surrey, England – 6 November 2001, Hamilton, New Zealand) was an English economist and historian of economic thought. He helped to edit The New Palgrave: A Dictionary of Economics, to which he contributed several articles.

== Bibliography ==
=== Books ===
- Newman, Peter K.; Eatwell, John; Milgate, Murray (1987). The new Palgrave: a dictionary of economics (2nd ed.). London New York Tokyo: Macmillan Stockton Press Maruzen. ISBN 9780333740408.
- Newman, Peter K.; Eatwell, John; Milgate, Murray (1989). The New Palgrave: allocation, information, and markets. New York: Norton. ISBN 9780393958546.
- Newman, Peter K.; Eatwell, John; Milgate, Murray (1990). The new Palgrave: capital theory. New York: Norton. ISBN 9780393958553.
- Newman, Peter K.; Eatwell, John; Milgate, Murray (1992). The new Palgrave dictionary of money & finance (3 volume set). London New York: Macmillan Press Stockton Press. ISBN 9780333527221.
- Newman, Peter K.; Englewoods Cliffs N.J./New York, Prentice-Hall. Inc. (1965) The Theory of Exchange: ISBN 9780139137723
- Newman, Peter K.; London, Institute of Race Relations, Oxford University Press (1964) British Guiana Problems of Cohesion in an Immigrant Society, ASIN: B0007FQPTI
- Newman, Peter K.; (ed): Baltimore/London Johns Hopkins University Press (1968) Readings in Mathematical Economics Vols I & II, ASIN: B00NCPS9WG
- Newman, Peter K.; (ed) Oxford University Press (2003) F.Y. Edgeworth's Mathematical Psychics and Further Papers on Political Economy, ISBN 0-19-828712-7

=== Selected dictionary contributions ===
- Newman, Peter K. (1987). "Convexity". In Newman, Peter K.; Eatwell, John; Milgate, Murray (eds.). The new Palgrave: a dictionary of economics (first ed.). Palgrave Macmillan. p. 1. doi:10.1057/9780230226203.2282. ISBN 978-0-333-78676-5.
- Newman, Peter K. (1987). "Duality". In Newman, Peter K.; Eatwell, John; Milgate, Murray (eds.). The new Palgrave: a dictionary of economics (first ed.). Palgrave Macmillan. p. 1. doi:10.1057/9780230226203.2412. ISBN 978-0-333-78676-5.

== External reference ==
- Obituary by Murray Milgate, The Independent (UK), 30 November 2001
