= John Eatwell, Baron Eatwell =

British economist (born 1945)

The Right Honourable The Lord Eatwell
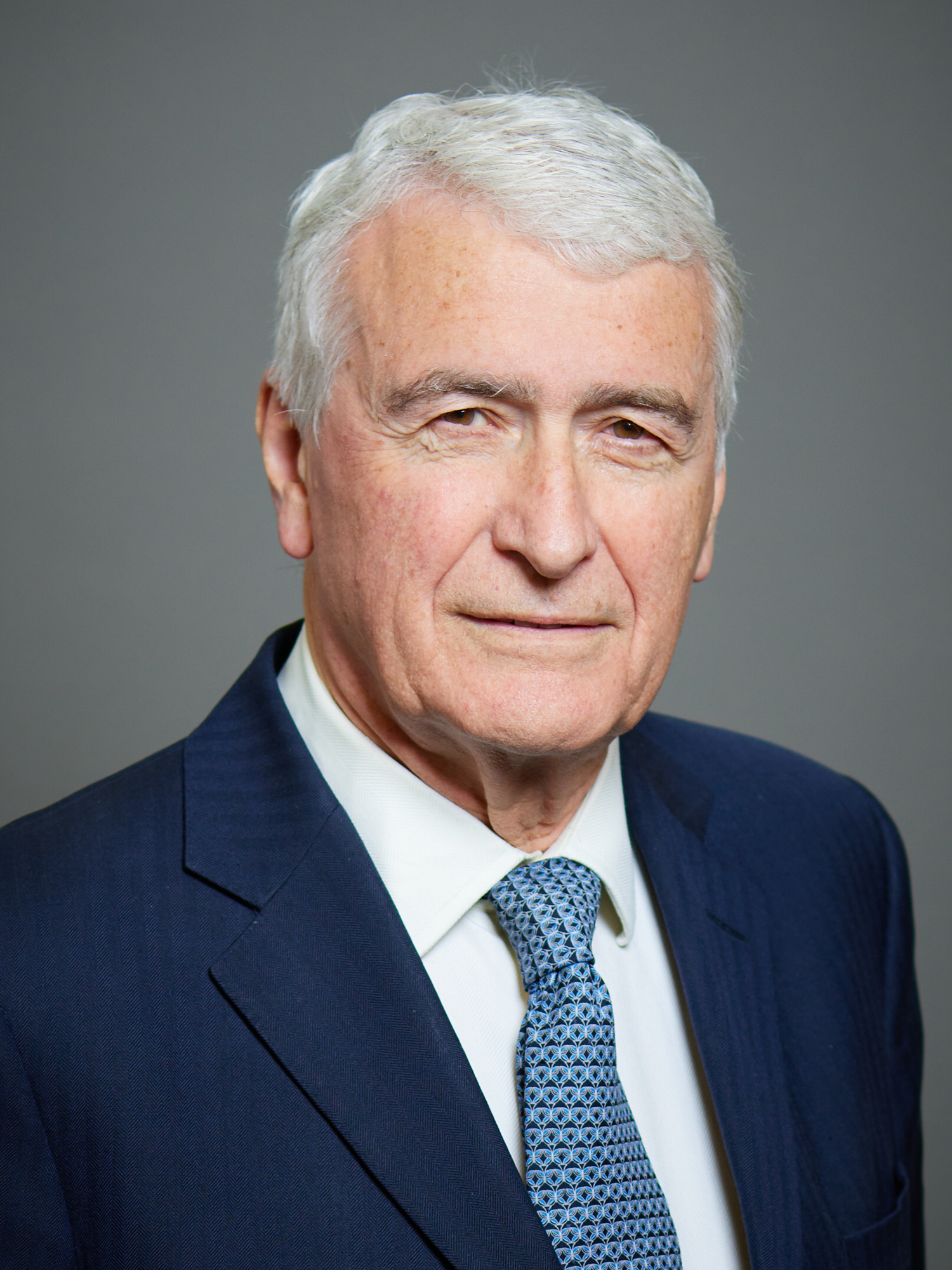

President of Queens' College, Cambridge
- In office 1996–2020
- Preceded by: John Polkinghorne
- Succeeded by: Mohamed A. El-Erian

Member of the House of Lords
- Lord Temporal
- Life peerage 14 July 1992

Personal details
- Born: John Leonard Eatwell; 2 February 1945 (age 81)
- Party: Labour
- Spouse: Suzi Digby (m. 2006)
- Occupation: Economist

Academic background
- Education: Queens' College, Cambridge; Harvard University

Academic work
- Discipline: Economics
- Sub-discipline: Post-Keynesian economics; Macroeconomic; public policy
- Institutions: Graduate School of Arts and Sciences, Harvard University; Queens' College, Cambridge; Trinity College, Cambridge; Judge Business School, University of Cambridge

John Leonard Eatwell, Baron Eatwell, (born 2 February 1945) is a British economist who was President of Queens' College, Cambridge, from 1996 to 2020. A former senior advisor to the Labour Party, Lord Eatwell sat in the House of Lords as a non-affiliated peer from 2014 to 2020, before returning to the Labour bench.

== Early life and education ==
Eatwell was born on 2 February 1945. He was educated at Headlands Grammar School in Swindon in Wiltshire. He studied at Queens' College, Cambridge, graduating with a Bachelor of Arts (BA) degree in 1967: as per tradition, his BA was promoted to a Master of Arts (MA Cantab) degree in 1971. As a Kennedy Scholar, he studied at Harvard University and graduated with a Doctor of Philosophy (PhD) degree in 1975.

== Career ==
=== Academic career ===
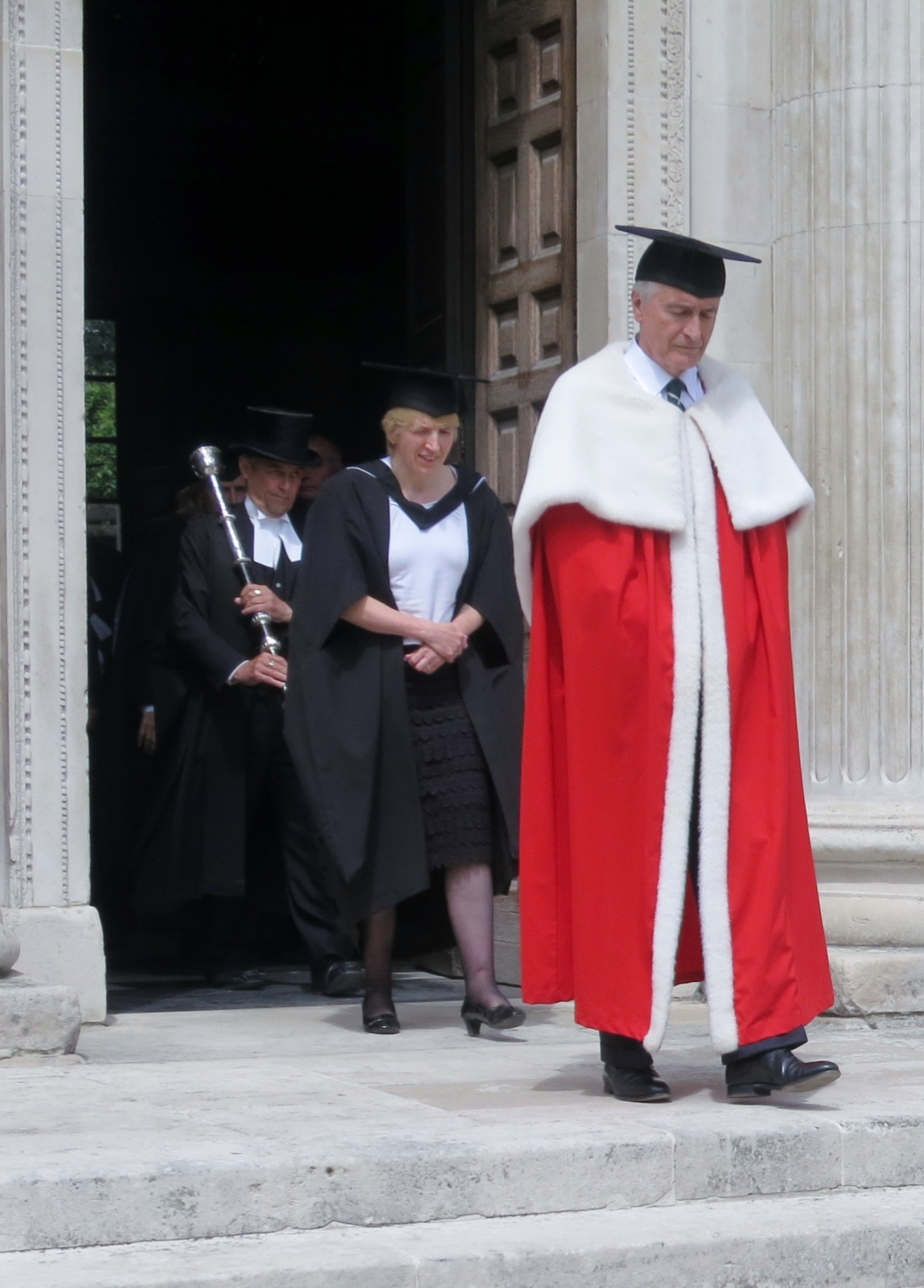
Lord Eatwell, in academic dress, at the Senate House in June 2014

While studying for his doctorate at Harvard University, Eatwell was a teaching fellow in the Harvard Graduate School of Arts and Sciences from 1968 to 1969 and a research fellow at Queens' College, Cambridge, from 1969 to 1970. In 1970, he was elected a Fellow of Trinity College, Cambridge, and would stay with the college for the next 36 years. Having completed his doctorate in 1975, he was an assistant lecturer (1975–1977) and then lecturer (1977–2002) in the University of Cambridge's Faculty of Economics and Politics. He was additionally a visiting professor in economics at the New School for Social Research in New York City from 1982 to 1996. He was President of Queens' College, Cambridge, from 1997 to 2020, and Professor of Financial Policy at the Cambridge Judge Business School from 2002 to 2012.

In May 2014, Lord Eatwell was appointed chair of the advisory board of the Institute for Policy Research (IPR) at the University of Bath.

The University of Bath awarded Lord Eatwell with an Honorary Doctorate of Policy Research and Practice (DPRP) in December 2022. The award recognises Eatwell as 'an internationally acclaimed economist who has made a distinguished contribution to the intellectual, political and cultural life of the United Kingdom.'

=== Political career ===
Eatwell was chief economic adviser to Neil Kinnock, the then-Leader of the Labour Party, from 1985 to 1992.

He was created a life peer as Baron Eatwell, of Stratton St Margaret in the County of Wiltshire, on 14 July 1992, and joined the House of Lords as a Labour peer. From 1992 to 1993, he was the opposition spokesman on Treasury affairs, and on trade and industry. He served as Principal Opposition spokesman on Treasury and economic affairs in the House of Lords from 1993 to 1997.

In 2010, he was appointed a Labour Opposition Spokesman for the Treasury in the House of Lords by former leader Ed Miliband. From 27 March 2014 to 23 April 2020, he sat as a non-affiliated peer. Once more sitting as a Labour peer, he has served on the Lords Industry and Regulators Committee since 14 April 2021.

=== Other works ===
Eatwell was chair of CRUSAID, an HIV/AIDS charity, from 1993 to 1998, and of the British Library Board from 2001 to 2006.

== Personal life ==
Eatwell was married to Hélène Seppain, with whom he has three children.

In 2006, he married Suzi Digby.

== Selected bibliography ==
=== Books ===
- Eatwell, John; Milgate, Murray (1983). Keynes's economics and the theory of value and distribution. London New York: Duckworth. ISBN 9780715617496.
- Eatwell, John; Milgate, Murray; Newman, Peter K. (1987). The New Palgrave: a dictionary of economics. London New York Tokyo: Macmillan Stockton Press Maruzen. ISBN 9780333740408.
- Eatwell, John; Milgate, Murray; Newman, Peter K. (1989). The New Palgrave: Allocation, information, and markets. New York: Norton. ISBN 9780393958546.
- Eatwell, John; Milgate, Murray; Newman, Peter K. (1990). The New Palgrave: capital theory. New York: Norton. ISBN 9780393958553.
- Eatwell, John; Milgate, Murray; Newman, Peter K. (1992). The new Palgrave dictionary of money & finance (3 volume set). London New York: Macmillan Press Stockton Press. ISBN 9780333527221.
- Eatwell, John (1996). Global unemployment: loss of jobs in the '90s. New York: M.E. Sharpe. ISBN 9781563245824.
- Eatwell, John; Rosenau, James; Jelin, Elizabeth; McGrew, Anthony (1998). Understanding globalisation: the nation-state, democracy and economic policies in the new epoch: essays. Stockholm: Almqvist & Wiksell. ISBN 9789122017820.
- Eatwell, John; Taylor, Lance (2000). Global finance at risk: the case for international regulation. New York: New Press. ISBN 9781565846388.
- Eatwell, John; Taylor, Lance (2002). International capital markets: systems in transition. Oxford New York: Oxford University Press. ISBN 9780195154986.
- Eatwell, John; Alexander, Kern; Dhumale, Rahul (2006). Global governance of financial systems the international regulation of systemic risk. Oxford New York: Oxford University Press. ISBN 9780195166989.
- Eatwell, John; Milgate, Murray (2011). The fall and rise of Keynesian economics. New York: Oxford University Press. ISBN 9780199777693.

=== Chapters in books ===
- Eatwell, John (1982), "Competition", in Meek, Ronald (author); Bradley, Ian C.; Howard, Michael C. (eds.), Classical and Marxian political economy: essays in honour of Ronald L. Meek, London: Macmillan, pp. 203–228, ISBN 9780333321997.
- Eatwell, John (1990), "Walras's theory of capital", in Eatwell, John; Milgate, Murray; Newman, Peter K. (eds.), The New Palgrave: capital theory, New York: Norton, pp. 247–256, ISBN 9780393958553.
- Eatwell, John (1995), "The international origins of unemployment", in Michie, Jonathan; Smith, John Grieve (eds.), Managing the global economy, Oxford New York: Oxford University Press, pp. 271–286, ISBN 9780198289685.
- Eatwell, John (1996), "Unemployment on a world scale", in Eatwell, John (ed.), Global unemployment: loss of jobs in the '90s, New York: M.E. Sharpe, pp. 3–20, ISBN 9781563245824.
- Eatwell, John (1995), "The international origins of unemployment", in Michie, Jonathan; Smith, John Grieve (eds.), Managing the global economy, Oxford New York: Oxford University Press, pp. 271–286, ISBN 9780198289685.
- Eatwell, John (1997), "Effective demand and disguised unemployment", in Michie, Jonathan; Smith, John Grieve (eds.), Employment and economic performance: jobs, inflation, and growth, New York: Oxford University Press, pp. 76–94, ISBN 9780198290933.
- Eatwell, John (1998), "The liberalisation of international capital movements: the impact on Europe, West and East", in Eatwell, John; Rosenau, James; Jelin, Elizabeth; et al. (eds.), Understanding globalisation: the nation-state, democracy and economic policies in the new epoch: essays, Stockholm: Almqvist & Wiksell, ISBN 9789122017820.
- Eatwell, John (1998), "Ethics and self-interest", in Jones, Ian; Pollitt, Michael (eds.), The role of business ethics in economic performance, Basingstoke: Macmillan, pp. 21–30, ISBN 9780333717417.
- Eatwell, John (2001), "New issues in international financial regulation", in Ferran, Eilis; Goodhart, Charles A.E. (eds.), Regulating financial services and markets in the twenty first century, Oxford Portland, Oregon: Hart Publishing, pp. 235–254, ISBN 9781841132792.
- Eatwell, John (2007), "Risk management and systemic risk", in Kołodko, Grzegorz W.; Estrin, Saul; Uvalic, Milica (eds.), Transition and beyond, New York: Pelgrave Macmillan, pp. 247–262, ISBN 9780230546974.
- Eatwell, John (2009), "Practical proposals for regulatory reform", in Subacchi, Paola (project co-director); Monsarrat, Alexei (project co-director) (eds.), New ideas for the London Summit: recommendations to the G20 leaders, London: Chatham House/Atlantic Council of the United States: Royal Institute of International Affairs, pp. 11–14, ISBN 9781862032163. Pdf version.

=== Journal articles ===
- Eatwell, John (November 1971). "On the proposed reform of corporation tax". Bulletin of the Oxford University Institute of Economics & Statistics. 33 (4). Wiley Online: 267–274. doi:10.1111/j.1468-0084.1971.mp33004003.x.
- Eatwell, John; Llewellyn, John; Tarling, Roger (October 1974). "Money wage inflation in industrial countries". Review of Economic Studies. 41 (4). Oxford University Press: 515–523. doi:10.2307/2296701. JSTOR 2296701.
- Eatwell, John (May 1975). "The interpretation of Ricardo's Essay on Profits". Economica. 42 (166). Wiley: 182–187. doi:10.2307/2553593. JSTOR 2553593.
- Eatwell, John (November 1975). "A note on the truncation theorem". Kyklos. 28 (4). Wiley: 870–875. doi:10.1111/j.1467-6435.1975.tb02179.x.
- Eatwell, John (November 1975). "Mr. Sraffa's standard commodity and the rate of exploitation". The Quarterly Journal of Economics. 89 (4). Oxford University Press: 543–555. doi:10.2307/1884691. JSTOR 1884691. (Originally printed in Ekonomiska in 1973.)
- Eatwell, John (March 1977). "The irrelevance of returns to scale in Sraffa's analysis". Journal of Economic Literature. 15 (1). American Economic Association: 61–68. JSTOR 2722714.
- Eatwell, John (March–April 1977). "Portrait: Joan Robinson". Challenge: The Magazine of Economic Affairs. 20 (1). M.E. Sharpe, Inc.R: 64–65. JSTOR 40719515.
- Eatwell, John (Spring 1980). "On the theoretical consistency of theories of surplus value: a comment on Savran". Capital & Class. 4 (1). Sage: 155–158. doi:10.1177/030981688001000110. S2CID 153850206.
- Eatwell, John; Milgate, Murray (1988). "Economic theory and European society: the influence of J.M. Keynes". History of European Ideas. 9 (2). Taylor and Francis: 215–225. doi:10.1016/0191-6599(88)90042-3.
- Eatwell, John (January 1993). "The global money trap: can Clinton master the markets?". American Prospect. 4 (12). The American Prospect: 118–126.
- Eatwell, John (December 1993). "Citizen Keynes". American Prospect. 5 (16). The American Prospect: 115–124.
- Eatwell, John (Spring 1994). "Institutions, efficiency, and the theory of economic policy". Social Research. 61 (1). The New School: 35–53. JSTOR 40971021.
- Eatwell, John; Wallace, P. (1996). "Responses: The British economy". New Statesman. 9 (402): 32. Archived from the original on 10 July 2014.
- Eatwell, John; Taylor, Lance (September–October 1999). "The American stock-flow trap". Challenge: The Magazine of Economic Affairs. 42 (5). M.E. Sharpe, Inc.: 34–49. JSTOR 40721969.
- Eatwell, John (Spring 1999). "The anatomy of the pensions 'crisis'". Capital & Class. 3. UNECE – United Nations Economic Commission for Europe: 57–67. Pdf version.
- Eatwell, John (1999). "From cooperation to coordination to control?". New Political Economy. 4 (3). Taylor and Francis: 410–415. doi:10.1080/13563469908406412.
- Eatwell, John; Taylor, Lance (1999). "Towards an effective regulation of international capital markets". International Politics and Society / Politik und Gesellschaft. 3. Friedrich-Ebert-Stiftung: 279–286.
- Eatwell, John (2000). "Unemployment: national policies in a global economy". International Journal of Manpower. 21 (5). Emerald Insight: 343–373. doi:10.1108/01437720010377675.
- Eatwell, John (November 2004). "Useful bubbles". Contributions to Political Economy. 23 (1). Oxford University Press: 35–47. doi:10.1093/conpec/bzh009.
- Eatwell, John; Izurieta, Alex; Cripps, Francis (24 December 2005). "Financial imbalances in the world economy". Economic and Political Weekly. 40 (52). EPW Research Foundation: 5453–5456. Archived from the original on 13 August 2014.
- Eatwell, John (Winter 2005). "Britain and America: ameliorating unilateralism". Social Research. 72 (4). The New School: 791–798. doi:10.1353/sor.2005.0030. JSTOR 40971794. S2CID 141741585.

=== Papers ===
- Eatwell, John; Ellman, Michael; Karlsson, Mats; Nuti Mario; and Shapiro, Judith. (1997) Not 'just another accession': the political economy of EU enlargement to the East. London: Institute for Public Policy Research.
- Eatwell, John and Taylor, Lance (2000) Capital flows and the international financial architecture: a paper from the Project on Development, Trade, and International Finance. New York, NY: Council on Foreign Relations Press.
- Eatwell, John; Ellman, Michael; Karlsson, Mats; Nuti Mario; and Shapiro, Judith. (2000) Hard budgets and soft states: social policy choices in central and eastern Europe. London: Institute for Public Policy Research.
- Eatwell, John; Alexander, Kern; Persaud, Avinash; and Reoch, Robert. (2007) Financial supervision and crisis management in the EU. Brussels: European Parliament Committee on Economic and Monetary Affairs.

== Arms ==
Coat of arms of John Eatwell, Baron Eatwell
| Crest A swan rousant Proper wings elevated and addorsed bezanty holding in the beak a lily Argent slipped and leaved Vert. Escutcheon Azure a fess dancetty between in chief semy of fleurs-de-lys enfiling ancient crowns and in base a beech tree windblown to the sinister and eradicated Argent a bordure Vert. Supporters On either side a cat Azure resting its interior hind foot on a hammer head in chief Or in front of a rugby football palewise Proper and resting its exterior hind foot on a closed book bound Vert edges Or charged on the spine with a needle and thread fesswise Argent. Motto Flectitur Non Frangitur (The Tree Bends But Does Not Break) Badge Two hammers in saltire Or heads upwards Argent in front of a fleur-de-lys also Argent all enfiling a coronet Or. |

Academic offices
| Preceded by John Polkinghorne | President of Queens' College, Cambridge; 1996–2020 | Succeeded by Mohamed A. El-Erian |
Orders of precedence in the United Kingdom
| Preceded by The Lord Owen | Gentlemen; Baron Eatwell | Followed by The Lord Plant of Highfield |
