= Foundations of Economic Analysis =

1947 book on economic theory by Paul Samuelson

- First edition (1947)
- Author: Paul A. Samuelson
- Language: English
- Subject: Mathematics; Economics
- Genre: Non-fiction
- Publisher: Harvard University Press
- Publication date: 1947

Foundations of Economic Analysis is a book by Paul A. Samuelson published in 1947 (Enlarged ed., 1983) by Harvard University Press. It is based on Samuelson's 1941 doctoral dissertation at Harvard University. The book sought to demonstrate a common mathematical structure underlying multiple branches of economics from two basic principles: maximizing behavior of agents (such as of utility by consumers and profits by firms) and stability of equilibrium as to economic systems (such as markets or economies). Among other contributions, it advanced the theory of index numbers and generalized welfare economics. It is especially known for definitively stating and formalizing qualitative and quantitative versions of the "comparative statics" method for calculating how a change in any parameter (say, a change in tax rates) affects an economic system. One of its key insights about comparative statics, called the correspondence principle, states that stability of equilibrium implies testable predictions about how the equilibrium changes when parameters are changed.

== Introduction ==
The front page quotes the motto of J. Willard Gibbs: "Mathematics is a language." The book begins with this statement:

The existence of analogies between central features of various theories implies the existence of a general theory which underlies the particular theories and unifies them with respect to those central features. This fundamental principle of generalization by abstraction was enunciated by the eminent American mathematician E. H. Moore more than thirty years ago. It is the purpose of the pages that follow to work out its implications for theoretical and applied economics.

Its other stated purpose (p. 3) is to show how operationally meaningful theorems can be described with a small number of analogous methods. Thus, "a general theory of economic theories" (1983, p. xxvi).

== Topical outline ==
The body of the book is 353 pages. Topics and applications covered (all in terms of theory) include the following.

Part I

- introduction
- equilibrium systems (such as for a market or economy)
- maximizing behavior (such as to profits by a firm and utility by a consumer) in the calculus

sales-tax increase on equilibrium for a firm

- comparative statics (changes in prices and quantities and other equilibrium variables when underlying conditions change)
- cost and production
- consumer's behavior
- transformations, elasticities, composite commodities, index numbers, and rationing
- cardinal utility, constancy of the marginal utility of income, and consumer's surplus
- welfare economics

Part II

- stability of equilibrium systems, dynamics (disturbances in equilibrium), and comparative statics

the Keynesian system

- linear and nonlinear systems

Malthusian and optimum population

- dynamics

the business cycle
endogenous models
mixed exogenous-endogenous theories
mixed systems of a linear-stochastic type

- conclusions (on neoclassical theory from Walras to hints of the future in comparative dynamics, the comparative-statics counterpart of dynamic systems)

== Methods and analysis ==
Samuelson's Foundations demonstrates that economic analysis benefits from the parsimonious and fruitful language of mathematics. In its original version as a dissertation submitted to the David A. Wells Prize Committee of Harvard University in 1941, it was subtitled "The Observational Significance of Economic Theory" (p. ix).

One unifying theme, on the striking formal similarities of analysis in seemingly diverse fields, occurred only in the course of writing on them — from consumer's behavior and production economics of the firm to international trade, business cycles, and income analysis. It dawned on the author that he was prodigal "in proving essentially the same theorems" over and over. His failure of initial intuition, so he suggests, might be less surprising in light of the few economic writings then extant concerned with formulating meaningful theorems – hypotheses about empirical data—that could conceivably be refuted by empirical data (pp. 3–5).

Samuelson (pp. 5, 21–24) finds three sources of meaningful theorems sufficient to illuminate his purposes:

- maximizing behavior of economic units (as to utility for a consumer and profit for a firm)
- economic systems (including markets and economies) in stable equilibrium
- qualitative properties between two or more variables, such as an alleged technological relation or psychological law (indexed by the sign of the relevant functional relationship).

Part I conjectures that meaningful theorems for economic units (for example individual households or firms, and for their respective aggregates are almost all derivable from general conditions of equilibrium. The equilibrium conditions can in turn be stated as maximization conditions. So, meaningful theorems reduce to maximization conditions. The calculus of the relations is at a high level of abstraction but with the advantage of numerous applications. Finally, Part I illustrates that there are meaningful theorems in economics, which apply to diverse fields.

Part II concentrates on aggregation of economic units into equilibrium of the system. But the symmetry conditions required for direct maximization of the system, whether a market or even the simplest model of the business cycle, are lacking, in contrast to an economic unit or its corresponding aggregate. What can be hypothetically derived (or rejected in some cases) is a stable equilibrium of the system. (This is an equilibrium of the system such that, if a variable disturbs equilibrium, the system converges to equilibrium.) Stability of equilibrium is proposed as the principal source of operationally meaningful theorems for economic systems (p. 5).

Analogies from physics (and biology) are conspicuous, such as the Le Chatelier principle and correspondence principle, but they are given a nontrivially generalized formulation and application. They and mathematical constructions, such as Lagrangian multipliers, are given an operational economic interpretation. The generalized Le Chatelier principle is for a maximum condition of equilibrium: where all unknowns of the function are independently variable, auxiliary constraints ("just-binding" in leaving initial equilibrium unchanged) reduce the response to a parameter change. Thus, factor-demand and commodity-supply elasticities are hypothesized to be lower in the short run than in the long run because of the fixed-cost constraint in the short run. In the course of analysis, comparative statics, changes in equilibrium of the system that result from a parameter change of the system, is formalized and most clearly stated (Kehoe, 1987, p. 517). The correspondence principle is that the stability of equilibrium for a system (such as a market or economy) implies meaningful theorems in comparative statics. Alternatively, the hypothesis of stability imposes directional restrictions on the movement of the system (Samuelson, pp. 258, 5). The correspondence is between comparative statics and the dynamics implied by stability of equilibrium.

The starting point of the analysis is the postulate of maximizing behavior. The point is not (or not only) that everyone is out to maximize even if true. Rather, first- and in particular higher-order (derivative) conditions of equilibrium at the maximum imply local behavioral relations (Samuelson, p. 16). The stability of equilibrium with sufficient other hypothetical qualitative restrictions then generates testable hypotheses (pp. 16, 28–29). Even where there is no context for purposive maximizing behavior, reduction to a maximization problem may be a convenient device for developing properties of the equilibrium, from which, however, no "teleological or normative welfare significance" is warranted (pp. 52–53).

Chapter VIII on welfare economics is described as an attempt "to give a brief but fairly complete survey of the whole field of welfare economics" (p. 252). This Samuelson does in 51 pages, including his exposition of what became known as the Bergson–Samuelson social welfare function. Theorems derived in welfare economics, he notes, are deductive implications of assumptions that are not refutable, thus not meaningful in a certain sense. Still, the social welfare function can represent any index (cardinal or not) of the economic measures of any logically possible ethical belief system that is required to order any (hypothetically) feasible social configurations as "better than", "worse than", or "indifferent to" each other (p. 221). It also definitively elucidates the notion of Pareto optimality and the "germ of truth in Adam Smith's doctrine of the invisible hand" (Samuelson, 1983, p. xxiv; Fischer, 1987, p. 236).

The final pages of the book (pp. 354–55) outline possible directions analytical methods might take, including for example models that show how:

- deficit financing could produce positive short-run effects on the economy that are swamped by adverse long-run effects on capital accumulation (seriously reconsidered later as crowding out)
- declines in age-specific mortality affect the net reproductive rate (whose implications for population growth are less abstract than they might first appear).

Samuelson closes by expressing hope in the future use of comparative dynamics to:

aid in the attack upon diverse problems – from the trivial behavior of a single small commodity, to the fluctuations of important components of the business cycle, and even to the majestic problems of economic development.

== Appendices ==
There are two mathematical appendices totalling 83 pages. The first gathers and develops "very briefly" and "without striving for rigor" results on maximization conditions and quadratic forms used in the book and not conveniently collected elsewhere (p. 389). The other is on difference equations ("for the dynamic economist") and other functional equations.

== Enlarged edition ==
The 1983 enlarged edition includes an additional 12-page "Introduction" and a new 145-page appendix with some post-1947 developments in analytical economics, including how conclusions of the book are affected by them.

== Assessments ==
- Kenneth Arrow (1983) describes Foundations as "the only example I know of a doctoral dissertation that is a treatise, perhaps I should say of a treatise that has so much originality in every part that it is entitled to be accepted as a thesis."
- Richard N. Cooper (1997) writes that the book "drastically redirected the advanced study of economics toward greater and more productive use of mathematics."
- Notwithstanding the important work of Arrow, Kotaro Suzumura (1987) affirms the Bergson-Samuelson social welfare function as "logically impeccable."
- The Nobel Prize citation is applicable to Foundations: "for the scientific work through which [Samuelson] has developed static and dynamic economic theory and actively contributed to raising the level of analysis in economic science."
- Samuelson himself assessed Foundations five decades later.
- Roger E. Backhouse (2015) writes that "Samuelson's Foundations played a major role in defining how economic theory was undertaken for many years after the Second World War." He cites Samuelson on Joseph Schumpeter, Wassily Leontief, Gottfried Haberler, and Alvin Hansen in "teach[ing] him modern economic analysis but mak[ing] it clear that the main influence on Foundations was [the mathematician and physicist] E. B. Wilson." "As economics became progressively more mathematical," he writes, "with graduate students increasingly expected to construct formal models of maximizing consumers and firms, Foundations was widely seen as the canonical exposition of such methods."

== See also ==
- Economic methodology
- Economics, a textbook also by Samuelson
- Mathematical economics
- Neoclassical economics
- Paul Samuelson
- Enrico Barone
- Social welfare function
