= Finnish models of public transport =

As of 2009, Finland has used three models for local public transport. The implementation of these models was regulated by national laws of passenger transport, which were abolished after European Union regulations and laws of public transport service (869/2009) came into effect on December 3, 2009. The Finnish government-owned railways are regulated by specific laws. The local railways in Helsinki (metro and tram) are regulated by the city's own laws and regulations.

Public vehicles required transport licenses. Cities that have been granted licenses include Espoo, Helsinki, Hyvinkää, Hämeenlinna, Imatra, Joensuu, Jyväskylä, Kajaani, Kemi, Kokkola, Kotka, Kouvola, Kuopio, Lahti, Lappeenranta, Mikkeli, Oulu, Pori, Rauma, Riihimäki, Rovaniemi, Savonlinna, Seinäjoki, Tampere, Turku, Vaasa, Vantaa, and Varkaus. Among those, Helsinki, Espoo, Vantaa, and Kauniainen received YTV granted licenses for traffic. Elsewhere, transport licenses were granted by the county boards.

The laws and regulations for passenger transport did not set any high-reaching goals such as passenger numbers or service levels. The intent of the law was that public transportation is foremost a business venture. The majority of Finnish public transportation has, however, been supported by the government either directly or indirectly. This could be by purchasing transportation or by subsidizing tickets for students, children, or other groups. The current law for public transportation sets in §3 the goal that the system needs to be developed in such way that it can provide public transportation that satisfies the necessary demand in the entire country. An additional goal for highly populated areas (over 50,000 inhabitants) is that the service level for these areas is so high that it promotes and increases the usage of public transportation.

== Line permission model ==
The line permission model described in the article has not been in use since the EU law of public transport service came into effect March 12 of 2009. The old licenses were turned into transportation agreements for a transitional period in order to continue the rights and obligations of the licenses as well as various ticket types. The transition period for these agreements will end in February 2019.

In the line permission model, tickets are subsidized and the profitless drives are purchased. Traffic contractors apply for transport licenses for various lines and specific drives. If no one applies for a license for a line that has been deemed necessary, it is bought on net tender principles. The community supports the system by subsidizing student tickets and by investing in municipality or region ticket prices to make public transportation more attractive and feasible for consumers.

The model was used in most parts of Finland except the YTV-area and the internal public transportation of Turku and Tampere municipalities. In practice, the railway traffic service that was run on VR Oy monopoly (excluding the YTV-area) followed this model.

Advantages

- The entrepreneur has risk and develops responsibility.
- The entrepreneur can produce the most affordable and competitive services.
- The model does not require significant planning from the community.
- From the point of view of the traffic contractor, the traffic is more independent.

Disadvantages

- The number of public transport trips is considerably lower compared to other systems. (Each trip yields 50% less profit than other systems.)
- The community has less power over the system, even though the support level per trip is higher than in other models.
- The subsidies also pay for tickets on profitable lines.
- The ticket subsidy arrangement leads to an increase in government spending as customer numbers increase.
- Malpractices have been noted in the system when some of the drives have been reported unprofitable, and the operator driving the rest of that line has won the tendering.
- Traveling is expensive for the passenger; the ticket systems do not offer affordable discounts; and the possibility of changing tickets will be restricted, mainly between lines of the same traffic contractor.

== Orderer-producer-model ==
In the orderer-producer model, a community plans the transportation system, buys services from different contractors, and pays from ticket revenues and through community subsidies. The main part from traffic is tendered. The model is used in HSL bus traffic, and in the Turku public transport. HSL buys train transportation from VR Group as if the transportation was tendered, but pays the price that has been defined by the monopoly of VR Oy. The Turku public transportation company receives a compensation proportioned to the tendering.

Advantages

- The passenger numbers are high.
- The production of the traffic is efficient.
- Society has good control over the system, can decide the level of service in detail, and can carry out any preferred traffic policy.
- Society can design the traffic and the urban structure simultaneously.

Disadvantages

- Almost all traffic risk is transferred to the society.
- The traffic contractor will not have an interest in developing the system, if the agreement lacks a functional rewarding and sanction system.
- The system has been reported for utilization of underpricing and cartels.
- The system contained problems regarding work safety and the position of the labor force. This was corrected by the so-called Lonka agreement.
- Smaller traffic contractors' future may be endangered if the company loses the tendering of its lines to other operators.

== Secured public transport model ==
The model of internal acquisitions is in use in the tramway traffic and underground service of Helsinki (Helsinki City Transport), in the internal traffic of Tampere (Traffic services of the city of Tampere about 90%), and in the local traffic of Turku (City transport of Turku about 20%.)

Advantages

- The society has power in detailed decisions over the traffic.
- Some of the possibilities correspond to tendered traffic systems.

Disadvantages

- The society bears all of the business risk.
- Ineffective and inert practices are risk factors in protected municipal service.

== See also ==
- Iceberg transport cost model
- Karlsruhe model
- Melbourne Principles
- Transport in Finland
- Transport in Europe
- Transport in France
- Zürich model
