= Zurich model =

The Zurich model is the approach by the city of Zurich, Switzerland, which allows its public transportation system to achieve and maintain a high market share. Many other cities have emulated elements of it, especially when new tram or light rail systems were introduced.

== History ==
In the 1970s, Zurich was planning to move many of the tram lines in its central area into tunnels. This project was rejected in a referendum. In the 1970s, a project to create an underground railway was similarly rejected.

Despite the failures of these attempts to provide Zurich with a different kind of transportation system, public transportation in Zurich has maintained a high modal split, with 65% of people commuting within the city doing so by public transport and only 17% using cars. In his book Status Anxiety, Alain de Botton has suggested why the model is so effective:

There are communities ... whose public realms exude respect in their principles and architecture, and whose citizens are therefore under less compulsion to retreat to a private domain. Indeed, we may find that some of our ambitions for personal glory fade when the public spaces and facilities to which we enjoy access are themselves glorious to behold: in such context, ordinary citizenship may come to seem an adequate goal. In Switzerland’s largest city, for instance, the need to own a car in order to avoid sharing a bus or train with strangers loses some of the urgency it has in Los Angeles or London, thanks to Zurich’s superlative tram network, which is clean, safe, warm and edifying in its punctuality and technical prowess. There is little reason to travel in an automotive cocoon when, for a fare of only a few francs, an efficient, stately tramway will provide transportation from point A to point B at a level of comfort an emperor might have envied.

== Elements of the model ==
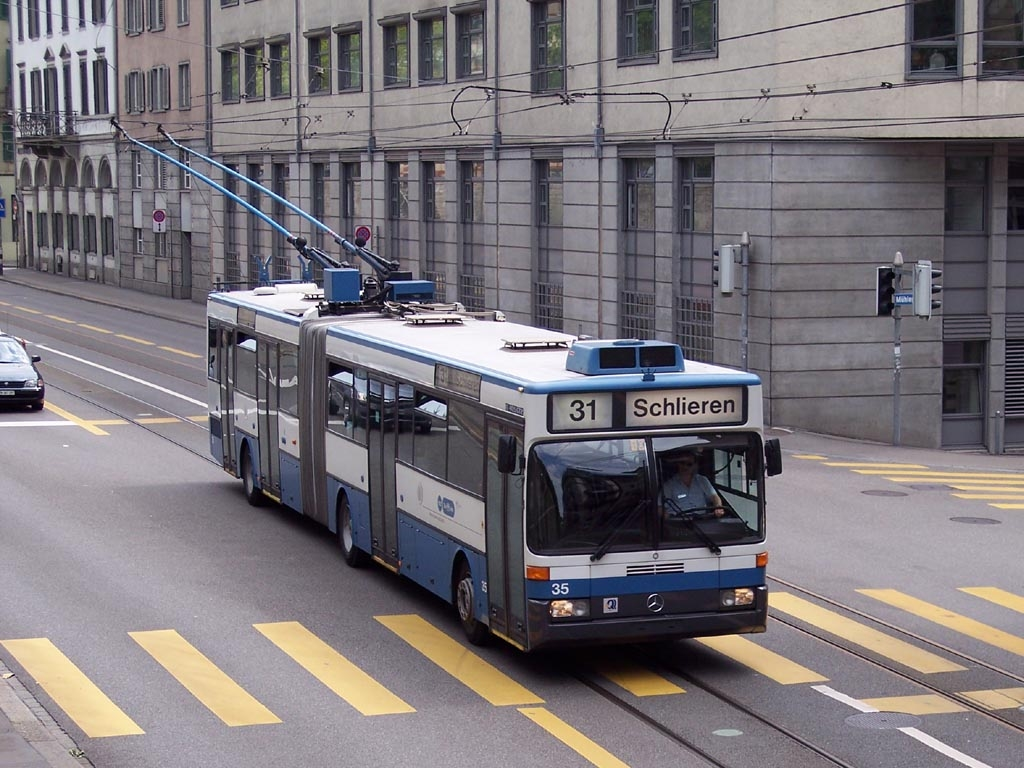
Separation of lanes and prioritisation at intersections

The model has the following characteristics:

- A dense network providing many direct connections and short headways at stations/stops.
- Higher priority for public transportation at road intersections (controlled by traffic lights).
- Low impact of road congestion on operations (through separate bus lanes and tram tracks).
- Parking maximums (introduced in 1989), followed by parking limits in the downtown area (1996).

== Public transport entities ==
The public transportation system in the city of Zurich consists of the following elements, which are part of the Zurich transportation network (Zürcher Verkehrsverbund, ZVV):

- Verkehrsbetriebe Zürich (VBZ)
  - Dolderbahn, a rack railway
  - Funicular Rigiblick
  - Polybahn, a funicular
  - Trams in Zurich
  - Trolleybuses in Zurich
- Motor buses of VBZ, VBG, PostAuto, AVA and AZZK
- Zurich S-Bahn, a commuter rail and rapid transit hybrid system serving all 28 railway stations in the city (and linking them with other stations within the Zurich Metropolitan Area)
- Lake Zurich navigation company (ZSG), operating on Lake Zurich and the river Limmat

== See also ==
- Health impact of light rail systems
- Finnish models of public transport
- Karlsruhe model
- Melbourne Principles
