= Paul Samuelson =

American economist and Nobel Laureate (1915–2009)

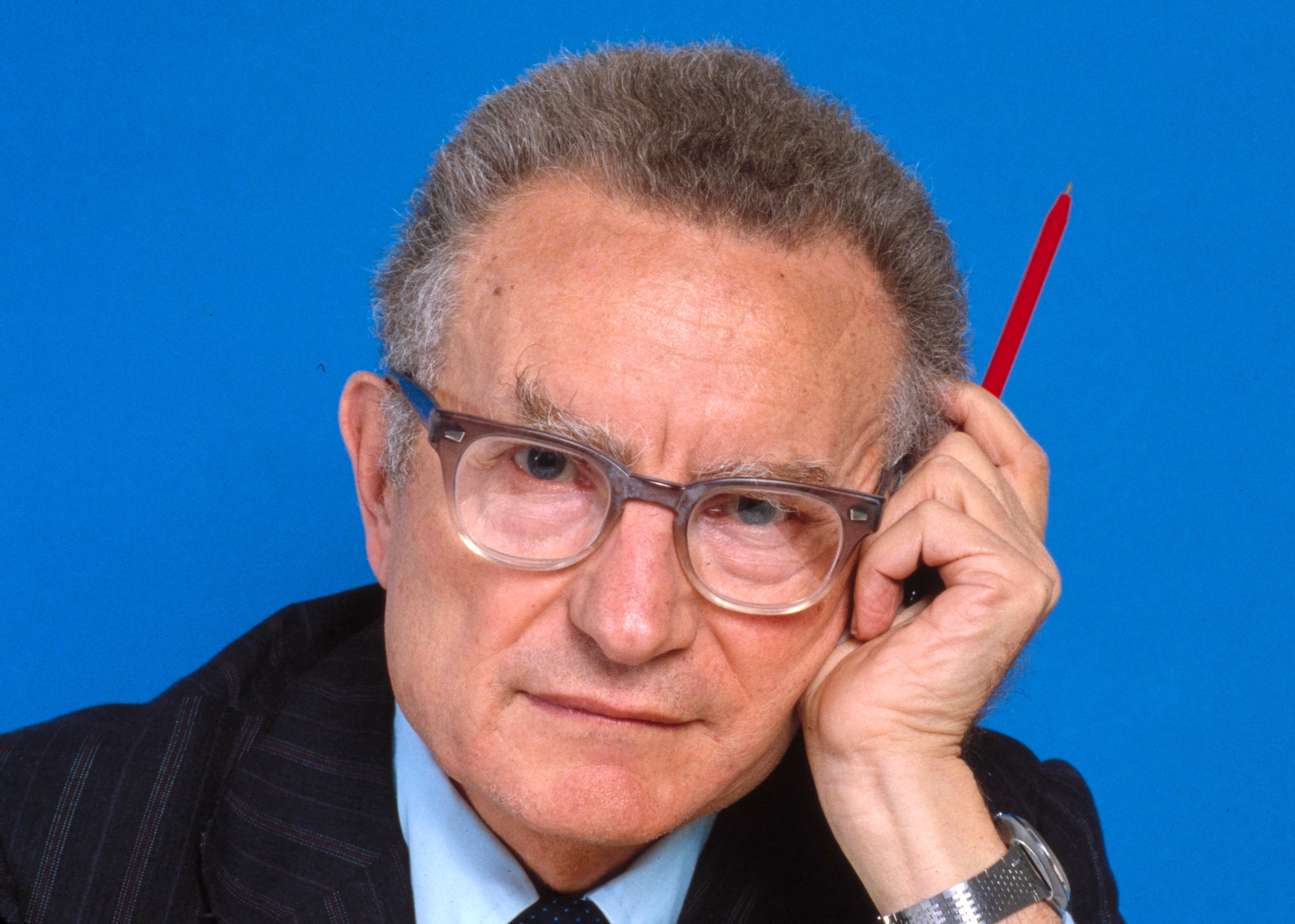
- Samuelson between 1970 and 1975
- Born: Paul Anthony Samuelson; May 15, 1915; Gary, Indiana, U.S.
- Died: December 13, 2009 (aged 94); Belmont, Massachusetts, U.S.
- Spouses: Marion Crawford (m. 1938; died 1978) Risha Clay (m. 1981)

Academic background
- Education: University of Chicago (BA); Harvard University (MA, PhD)
- Doctoral advisor: Joseph Schumpeter; Wassily Leontief
- Influences: Keynes • Schumpeter • Leontief • Haberler • Hansen • Wilson • Wicksell • Lindahl

Academic work
- Discipline: Macroeconomics
- School or tradition: Neo-Keynesian economics
- Institutions: Massachusetts Institute of Technology
- Doctoral students: Lawrence Klein; Robert C. Merton
- Notable ideas: Neoclassical synthesis Mathematical economics Economic methodology Revealed preference International trade Economic growth Public goods
- Awards: John Bates Clark Medal (1947); Nobel Memorial Prize in Economic Sciences (1970); National Medal of Science (1996)
- Website: Information at IDEAS / RePEc

Signature
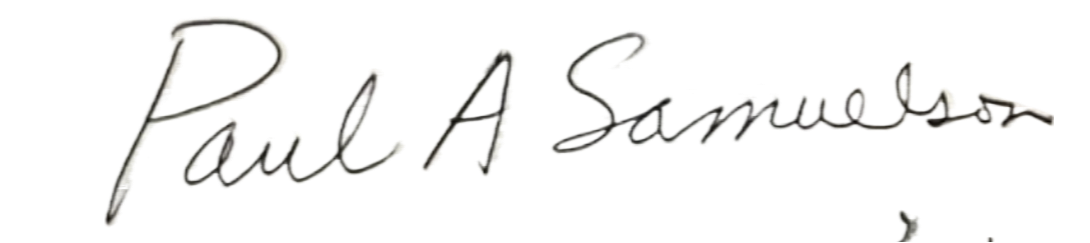

Paul Anthony Samuelson (May 15, 1915 – December 13, 2009) was an American economist who was the first American to win the Nobel Memorial Prize in Economic Sciences. When awarding the prize in 1970, the Swedish Royal Academies stated that he "has done more than any other contemporary economist to raise the level of scientific analysis in economic theory".

Samuelson was one of the most influential economists of the latter half of the 20th century. In 1996, he was awarded the National Medal of Science. Samuelson considered mathematics to be the "natural language" for economists and contributed significantly to the mathematical foundations of economics with his book Foundations of Economic Analysis. He was author of the best-selling economics textbook of all time: Economics: An Introductory Analysis, first published in 1948. It was the second American textbook that attempted to explain the principles of Keynesian economics.

Samuelson served as an advisor to President John F. Kennedy and President Lyndon B. Johnson, and was a consultant to the United States Treasury, the Bureau of the Budget and the President's Council of Economic Advisers. Samuelson wrote a weekly column for Newsweek magazine along with Chicago School economist Milton Friedman, where they represented opposing sides: Samuelson, as a self described "Cafeteria Keynesian", claimed taking the Keynesian perspective but only accepting what he felt was good in it. By contrast, Friedman represented the monetarist perspective. Together with Henry Wallich, their 1967 columns earned the magazine a Gerald Loeb Special Award in 1968.

== Biography ==
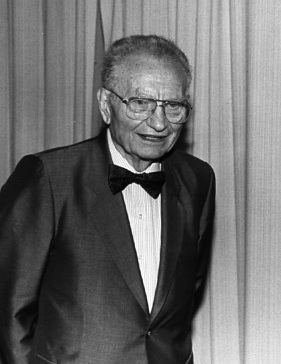
Samuelson in 1997

Samuelson was born in Gary, Indiana, on May 15, 1915, to Frank Samuelson, a pharmacist, and Ella née Lipton. His family, he later said, was "made up of upwardly mobile Jewish immigrants from Poland who had prospered considerably in World War I, because Gary was a brand new steel-town when my family went there". In 1923, Samuelson moved to Chicago where he graduated from Hyde Park High School (now Hyde Park Career Academy).

Samuelson attended the University of Chicago as an undergraduate, earning a Bachelor of Arts degree in 1935. He said he was born as an economist at 8:00 am on January 2, 1932, in the University of Chicago classroom. The lecture mentioned as the cause was on the British economist Thomas Malthus, who most famously studied population growth and its effects. Samuelson felt there was a dissonance between neoclassical economics and the way the system seemed to behave; he said Henry Simons and Frank Knight were a big influence on him. He next completed his Master of Arts degree in 1936, and his Doctor of Philosophy in 1941 at Harvard University. He won the David A. Wells Prize in 1941 for writing the best doctoral dissertation at Harvard University in economics, for a thesis titled "Foundations of Analytical Economics", which later turned into Foundations of Economic Analysis. As a graduate student at Harvard, Samuelson studied economics under Joseph Schumpeter, Wassily Leontief, Gottfried Haberler, and the "American Keynes" Alvin Hansen.

Samuelson moved to MIT as an assistant professor in 1940 and remained there until his death. Samuelson's biographer argues that a central reason for Samuelson's move from Harvard to MIT was the anti-Semitism that was famously widespread at Harvard at the time. In a 1989 letter to his friend Henry Rosovsky, Samuelson blamed anti-Semitism in Harvard economics above all on chair Harold Burbank, as well as on Edward Chamberlin, John H. Williams, John D. Black, and Leonard Crum.

Samuelson's family included many well-known economists, including brother Robert Summers, sister-in-law Anita Summers, brother-in-law Kenneth Arrow and nephew Larry Summers.

During his seven decades as an economist, Samuelson's professional positions included:

- Assistant professor of economics at MIT, 1940; associate professor, 1944.
- Member of the Radiation Laboratory 1944–45.
- Professor of international economic relations (part-time) at the Fletcher School of Law and Diplomacy in 1945.
- Guggenheim Fellowship from 1948 to 1949
- Professor of economics at MIT beginning in 1947 and Institute Professor beginning in 1962.
- Vernon F. Taylor Visiting Distinguished Professor at Trinity University (Texas) in spring 1989.

=== Death ===
Samuelson died after a brief illness on December 13, 2009, at the age of 94. His death was announced by the Massachusetts Institute of Technology. James M. Poterba, an economics professor at MIT and the president of the National Bureau of Economic Research, commented that Samuelson "leaves an immense legacy, as a researcher and a teacher, as one of the giants on whose shoulders every contemporary economist stands". Susan Hockfield, the president of MIT, said that Samuelson "transformed everything he touched: the theoretical foundations of his field, the way economics was taught around the world, the ethos and stature of his department, the investment practices of MIT, and the lives of his colleagues and students". His second wife died in 2019.

== Fields of interest ==
As professor of economics at the Massachusetts Institute of Technology, Samuelson worked in many fields, including:

- Consumer theory, where he pioneered the revealed preference approach, which is a method by which one can discern a consumer's utility function, by observing their behavior. Rather than postulate a utility function or a preference ordering, Samuelson imposed conditions directly on the choices made by individuals – their preferences as revealed by their choices.
- Welfare economics and public finance theory, in which he popularised the Lindahl–Bowen–Samuelson conditions (criteria for deciding whether an action will improve welfare) and demonstrated in 1950 the insufficiency of a national-income index to reveal which of two social options was uniformly outside the other's (feasible) possibility function, and he is particularly known for his work on determining the optimal allocation of resources in the presence of both public goods and private goods.
- Capital theory, where he is known for 1958 consumption loans model and a variety of turnpike theorems and involved in Cambridge capital controversy.
- Finance theory, in which he is known for the random walk hypothesis and efficient-market hypothesis.
- International economics, where he influenced the development of two important international trade models: the Balassa–Samuelson effect, and the Heckscher–Ohlin model (with the Stolper–Samuelson theorem).
- Macroeconomics, where he popularized the overlapping generations model as a way to analyze economic agents' behavior across multiple periods of time, developed multiplier-accelerator model, analyzed the Phillips curve, and contributed to formation of the neoclassical synthesis.

== Impact ==
Samuelson is considered one of the founders of neo-Keynesian economics and a seminal figure in the development of neoclassical economics. In awarding him the Nobel Memorial Prize in Economic Sciences, the committee stated:

More than any other contemporary economist, Samuelson has helped to raise the general analytical and methodological level in economic science. He has simply rewritten considerable parts of economic theory. He has also shown the fundamental unity of both the problems and analytical techniques in economics, partly by a systematic application of the methodology of maximization for a broad set of problems. This means that Samuelson's contributions range over a large number of different fields.

He was also essential in creating the neoclassical synthesis, which ostensibly incorporated Keynesian and neoclassical principles and still dominates current mainstream economics. In 2003, Samuelson was one of the ten Nobel Prize–winning economists signing the Economists' statement opposing the Bush tax cuts.

Samuelson believed unregulated markets have drawbacks, he stated, "free markets do not stabilise themselves. Zero regulating is vastly suboptimal to rational regulating. Libertarianism is its own worst enemy!" Samuelson strongly criticised Friedman and Friedrich Hayek, arguing their opposition to state intervention "tells us something about them rather than something about Genghis Khan or Franklin Roosevelt. It is paranoid to warn against inevitable slippery slopes ... once individual commercial freedoms are in any way infringed upon."

== Aphorisms and quotations ==
Stanislaw Ulam once challenged Samuelson to name one theory in all of the social sciences that is both true and nontrivial. Several years later, Samuelson responded with David Ricardo's theory of comparative advantage: "That it is logically true need not be argued before a mathematician; that it is not trivial is attested by the thousands of important and intelligent men who have never been able to grasp the doctrine for themselves or to believe it after it was explained to them."

For many years, Samuelson wrote a column for Newsweek. One article included Samuelson's most quoted remark and a favorite economics joke:

To prove that Wall Street is an early omen of movements still to come in GNP, commentators quote economic studies alleging that market downturns predicted four out of the last five recessions. That is an understatement. Wall Street indexes predicted nine out of the last five recessions! And its mistakes were beauties.

In the early editions of his famous, bestselling economics textbook Paul Samuelson joked that GDP falls when a man "marries his maid".

== Publications ==
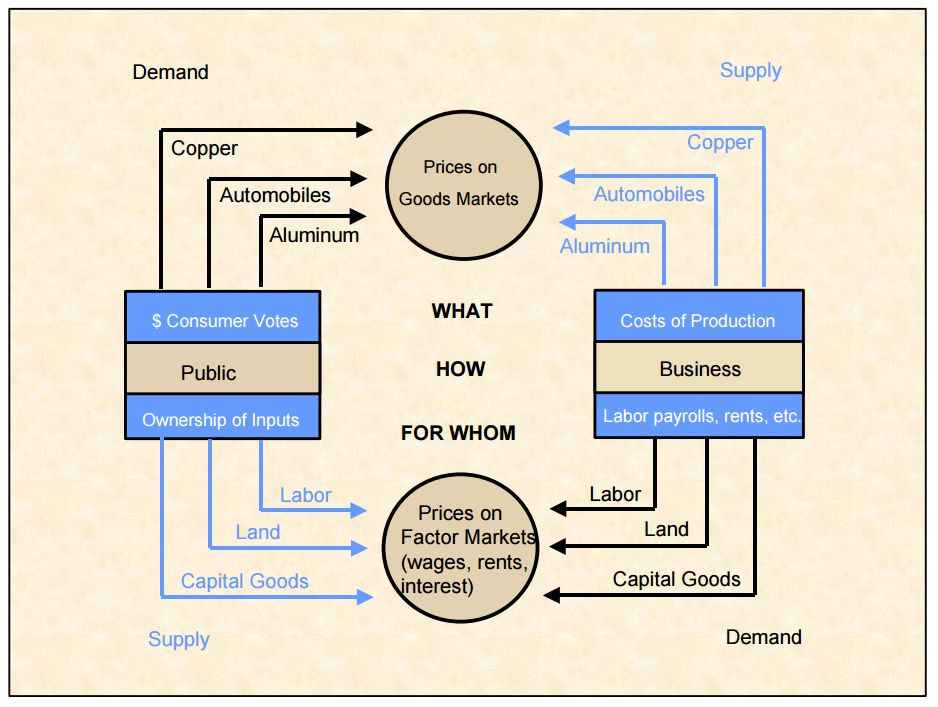
The competitive price system adapted from Samuelson, 1961

=== Foundations of Economic Analysis ===
Paul Samuelson's book Foundations of Economic Analysis (1946) is considered his magnum opus. It is derived from his doctoral dissertation, and was inspired by the classical thermodynamic methods. The book proposes to:

- Examine underlying analogies between central features in theoretical and applied economics and
- Study how operationally meaningful theorems can be derived with a small number of analogous methods (p. 3),

in order to derive "a general theory of economic theories" (Samuelson, 1983, p. xxvi). The book showed how these goals could be parsimoniously and fruitfully achieved, using the language of the mathematics applied to diverse subfields of economics. The book proposes two general hypotheses as sufficient for its purposes:

- Maximizing behavior of agents (including consumers as to utility and business firms as to profit) and
- Economic systems (including a market and an economy) in stable equilibrium.

The first tenet suggests that all actors, whether firms or consumers, are striving to maximize something. They could be attempting to maximize profits, utility, or wealth, but it did not matter because their efforts to improve their well-being would provide a basic model for all actors in an economic system. His second tenet focuses on providing insight on the workings of equilibrium in an economy. Generally in a market, supply would equal demand. However, he noted that this isn't always the case and that the important thing to look at was a system's natural resting point. Foundations presents the question of how an equilibrium would react when it is moved from its optimal point. Samuelson was also influential in providing explanations on how the changes in certain factors can affect an economic system. For example, he could explain the economic effect of changes in taxes or new technologies.

In the course of analysis, comparative statics, (the analysis of changes in equilibrium of the system that result from a parameter change of the system) is formalized and clearly stated.

The chapter on welfare economics "attempt(s) to give a brief but fairly complete survey of the whole field of welfare economics" (Samuelson, 1947, p. 252). It also exposits on and develops what became commonly called the Bergson–Samuelson social welfare function. It shows how to represent (in the maximization calculus) all real-valued economic measures of any belief system that is required to rank consistently different feasible social configurations in an ethical sense as "better than", "worse than", or "indifferent to" each other (p. 221).

=== Economics ===
Samuelson is also author (and from 1985 co-author) of an influential principles textbook, Economics, first published in 1948 (19th ed. as of 2010; multiple reprints). The book sold more than 300,000 copies of each edition from 1961 through 1976 and was translated into forty-one languages. As of 2018, it had sold over four million copies. William Nordhaus joined as co-author on the 12th edition (1985). Sometime before 1988, it had become the best-selling economics textbook of all time.

Samuelson was once quoted as saying, "Let those who will write the nation's laws if I can write its textbooks." Written in the shadow of the Great Depression and the Second World War, it helped to popularize the insights of John Maynard Keynes. A main focus was how to avoid, or at least mitigate, the recurring slumps in economic activity.

Samuelson wrote: "It is not too much to say that the widespread creation of dictatorships and the resulting World War II stemmed in no small measure from the world's failure to meet this basic economic problem [the Great Depression] adequately." This reflected the concern of Keynes himself with the economic causes of war and the importance of economic policy in promoting peace.

Samuelson's book was the second to introduce Keynesian economics to a wide audience, and was by far the most successful. Canadian economist Lorie Tarshis, who had been a student attending Keynes's lectures at Harvard in the 1930s, published in 1947 an introductory textbook that incorporated his lecture notes, titled Elements of Economics.

Samuelson's textbook was a watershed in introducing the serious study of business cycles to the economics curriculum. It was particularly timely because it followed the Great Depression. The study of business cycles along with the introduction of the Keynesian approach of aggregate demand set the stage for the macroeconomic revolution in America, which then diffused throughout the world through translations into every major language. Generations of students, who then became teachers, learned their first and most influential lessons from Samuelson's Economics. It attracted many imitators, who became successful in different niches of the college market.

The text was not without criticism. While it praised the "mixed economy" of market and government, some found that too radical and attacked it as socialist. As a precursor to criticisms of Samuelson's Economics textbook, Lorie Tarshis's textbook was attacked by trustees of, and donors to, American colleges and universities as preaching a "socialist heresy". Piling on, William F. Buckley, Jr., in his 1951 book, God and Man at Yale, devoted an entire chapter, attacking both Samuelson's and Tarshis' textbooks. For Samuelson's book, Buckley drew from the Educational Examiner and credited it as an "excellent review of Samuelson's text." ("Note to Chapter Two." p. 234) (Note: The Educational Reviewer was founded in 1949 by Lucille Cardin Crain (née Marie Lucille Gabrielle Cardin; 1901–1983), a conservative activist whose primary interest was in – as she stated in 1951 – "rooting out radical influences in American education." In each issue, arch-conservative academicians and writers offered their views of high school and college textbooks as evidence of collectivist content and the like. The publication, for the first three years, was chiefly financed by William F. Buckley, Jr. Crain's husband, Kenneth Cardwell Crain (1883–1969), was a brother of Gustavus Demetrious Crain, Jr. (1885–1973), founder of Crain Communications.) For Tarshis' book, Buckley drew from Merwin K. Hart's organization to wit: "I am also grateful to the National Economic Council for its telling analysis of the Tarshis." ("Note to Chapter Two." p. 234) Buckley essentially characterized both as – in the words of Paul Davidson – "communist inspired". Buckley, for the rest of his life, defended the criticisms set forth in his book.

=== Other publications ===
There are 388 papers in Samuelson's Collected Scientific Papers. Stanley Fischer (1987, p. 234) writes that taken together they are "unique in their verve, breadth of economic and general knowledge, mastery of setting, and generosity of allusions to predecessors".

Samuelson was co-editor, along with William A. Barnett, of Inside the Economist's Mind: Conversations with Eminent Economists (Blackwell Publishing, 2007), a collection of interviews with notable economists of the 20th century.

== Memberships ==
- Member of the American Academy of Arts and Sciences, the American Philosophical Society, the United States National Academy of Sciences,
- Fellow of the British Academy
- President (1965–68) of the International Economic Association
- Member and past president (1961) of the American Economic Association
- Member of the editorial board and past president (1951) of the Econometric Society
- Fellow, council member and past vice-president of the Royal Economic Society.
- Member of Phi Beta Kappa.

== Selected publications ==
=== Textbooks and chapters ===
- Samuelson, Paul A. (1947), Enlarged ed. 1983. Foundations of Economic Analysis, Harvard University Press.
- Samuelson, Paul A. (1948), Economics: An Introductory Analysis, ISBN 0070747415; with William D. Nordhaus (since 1985), 2009, 19th ed., McGraw–Hill. ISBN 978-0071263832
- Samuelson, Paul A. (1958), Linear Programming and Economic Analysis with Robert Dorfman and Robert M. Solow, McGraw–Hill. Chapter-preview links.

=== Chapters ===
- Samuelson, Paul A. (1966) [1960]. "Efficient paths of capital accumulation in terms of the calculus of variations". In Arrow, Kenneth J.; Karlin, Samuel; Suppes, Patrick (eds.). Mathematical models in the social sciences, 1959: Proceedings of the first Stanford symposium. Stanford mathematical studies in the social sciences, IV. Stanford, California: Stanford University Press. pp. 77–88. ISBN 978-0804700214.
- Samuelson, Paul A. (1982). "Quesnay's 'Tableau Economique' as a theorist would formulate it today". In Meek, Ronald; Bradley, Ian C.; Howard, Michael C. (eds.). Classical and Marxian political economy: essays in honour of Ronald L. Meek. London: Macmillan. pp. 45–78. ISBN 978-0333321997.

=== Journal articles ===
- Samuelson, Paul A. (1952). "Economic Theory and Mathematics – An Appraisal" (PDF). American Economic Review. 42 (2): 56–66.
- Samuelson, Paul A (1954). "The Pure Theory of Public Expenditure". Review of Economics and Statistics. 36 (4): 387–89. doi:10.2307/1925895. JSTOR 1925895. S2CID 153571905.

=== Collected works ===
- The Collected Scientific Papers of Paul A. Samuelson, MIT Press. Preview links for vol. 1–3 below. Contents links for vol. 4–7. OCLC 1079936608 (all editions).
  - Samuelson, Paul A. (1966), Vol. 1 → via Google Books, 1937–mid-1964.
  - ––. (1966), Vol. 2 → via Google Books, 1937–mid-1964.
  - ––. (1972), Vol. 3 → via Google Books, mid-1964–1970.
  - ––.(1977), Vol. 4 → via Internet Archive (registration required), 1971–76.
  - ––. (1986), Vol. 5 → via Google Books, 1977–1985 Description → via
  - ––. (2011), Vol. 6, 1986–2009. Description → via Wayback Machine
  - ––. (2011), Vol. 7, 1986–2009.

=== Essays ===
- Samuelson, Paul A. (1983). "My Life Philosophy", The American Economist, 27(2), pp. 5–12.
- Samuelson, Paul A. (2007), Inside the Economist's Mind: Conversations with Eminent Economists with William A. Barnett, Blackwell Publishing, ISBN 1405159170
- Samuelson, Paul A. (2002), Paul Samuelson and the Foundations of Modern Economics, Transaction Publishers, ISBN 978-0765801142

=== Papers ===
- Paul A. Samuelson Papers, 1933–2010, Rubenstein Library, Duke University. OCLC 664246147.

== See also ==
- Samuelson's inequality
- Samuelson's Iceberg transport cost model
- Keynesian economics
- New Keynesian economics
- Neo-Keynesian economics
- Neoclassical economics
- Paul Samuelson – Wikiquote
- List of Jewish Nobel laureates

== Notes ==
=== References ===
Awards
Preceded by Ragnar Frisch; Jan Tinbergen	Laureate of the Nobel Memorial Prize in Economics; 1970	Succeeded by Simon Kuznets
