= Transport in Finland =

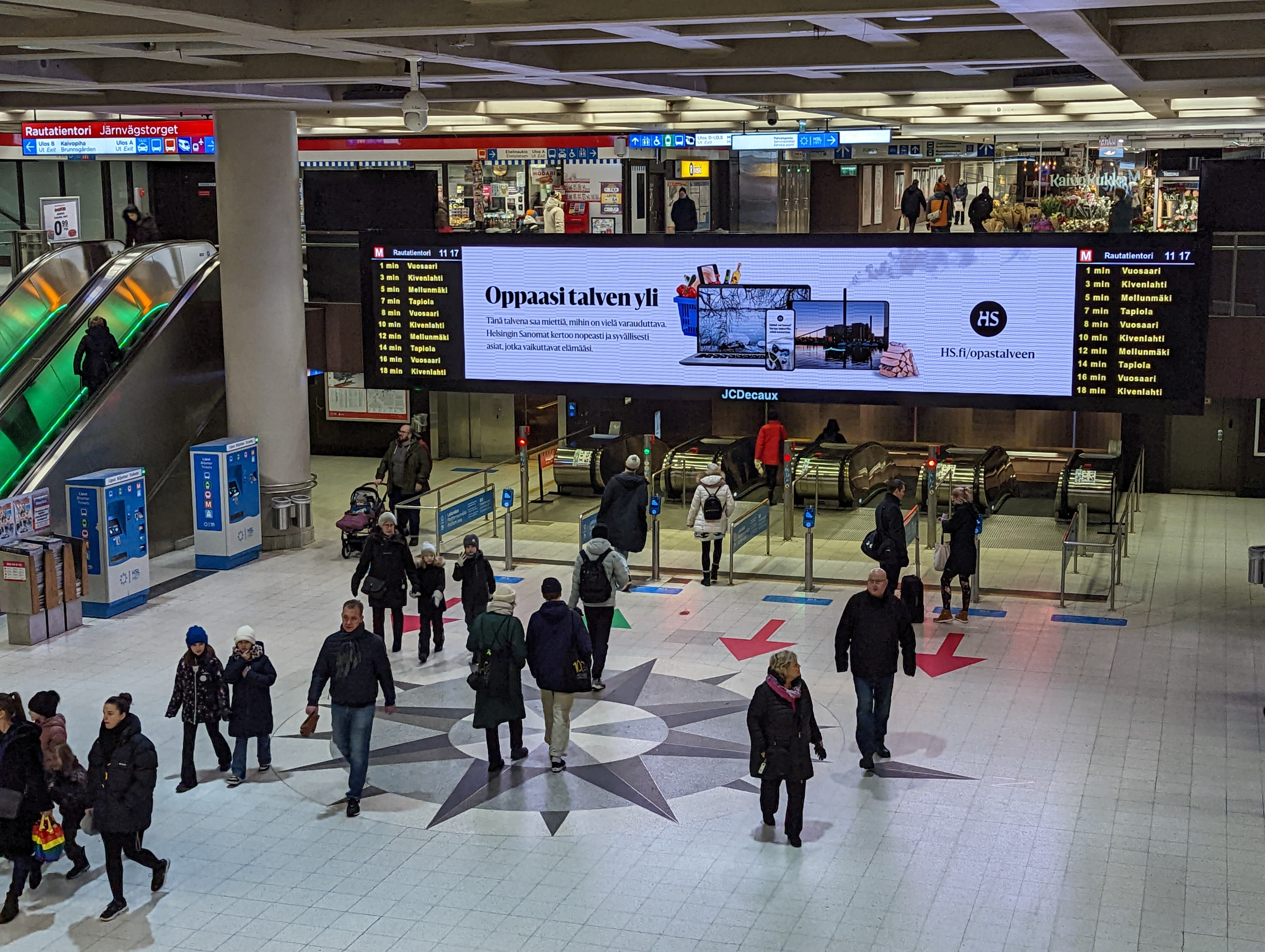
Helsinki Central Station

The transport system of Finland is well-developed. Factors affecting traffic include the sparse population and long distance between towns and cities, and the cold climate with waterways freezing and land covered in snow for winter.

The extensive road system is utilized by most internal cargo and passenger traffic. As of 2010, the country's network of main roads has a total length of around 78,162 kilometres (48,568 mi) and all public roads 104,161 kilometres (64,723 mi). The motorway network totals 779 kilometres (484 mi) with additional 124 kilometres (77 mi) reserved only for motor traffic. Road network expenditure of around €1 billion is paid with vehicle and fuel taxes that amount to around €1.5 billion and €1 billion, respectively.

The main international passenger gateway is Helsinki-Vantaa Airport with over 20 million passengers in 2018. About 25 airports have scheduled passenger services. They are financed by competitive fees and rural airport may be subsidized. The Helsinki-Vantaa based Finnair (known for an Asia-focused strategy), Nordic Regional Airlines provide air services both domestically and internationally. Helsinki has an optimal location for great circle routes between Western Europe and the Far East. Hence, many international travelers visit Helsinki on a stop-over between Asia and Europe.

Despite low population density, taxpayers spend annually around €350 million in maintaining 5,865 kilometres (3,644 mi) railway tracks even to many rural towns. Operations are privatized and currently the only operator is the state-owned VR. It has 5 percent passenger market share (out of which 80 percent are urban trips in Greater Helsinki) and 25 percent cargo market share. Helsinki has an urban rail network.

Icebreakers keep the 23 ports open all year round. There is passenger traffic from Helsinki and Turku, which have ferry connections to Tallinn, Mariehamn, Sweden and several other destinations.

== Roads ==
Road transport in Finland is the most popular method of transportation, particularly in rural areas where the railway network does not extend to. As of 2011 there are 78,162 kilometres (48,568 mi) of public roads, of which 51,016 kilometres (31,700 mi) are paved. The main road network comprises over 13,329 kilometres (8,282 mi) of road.

=== Highways ===
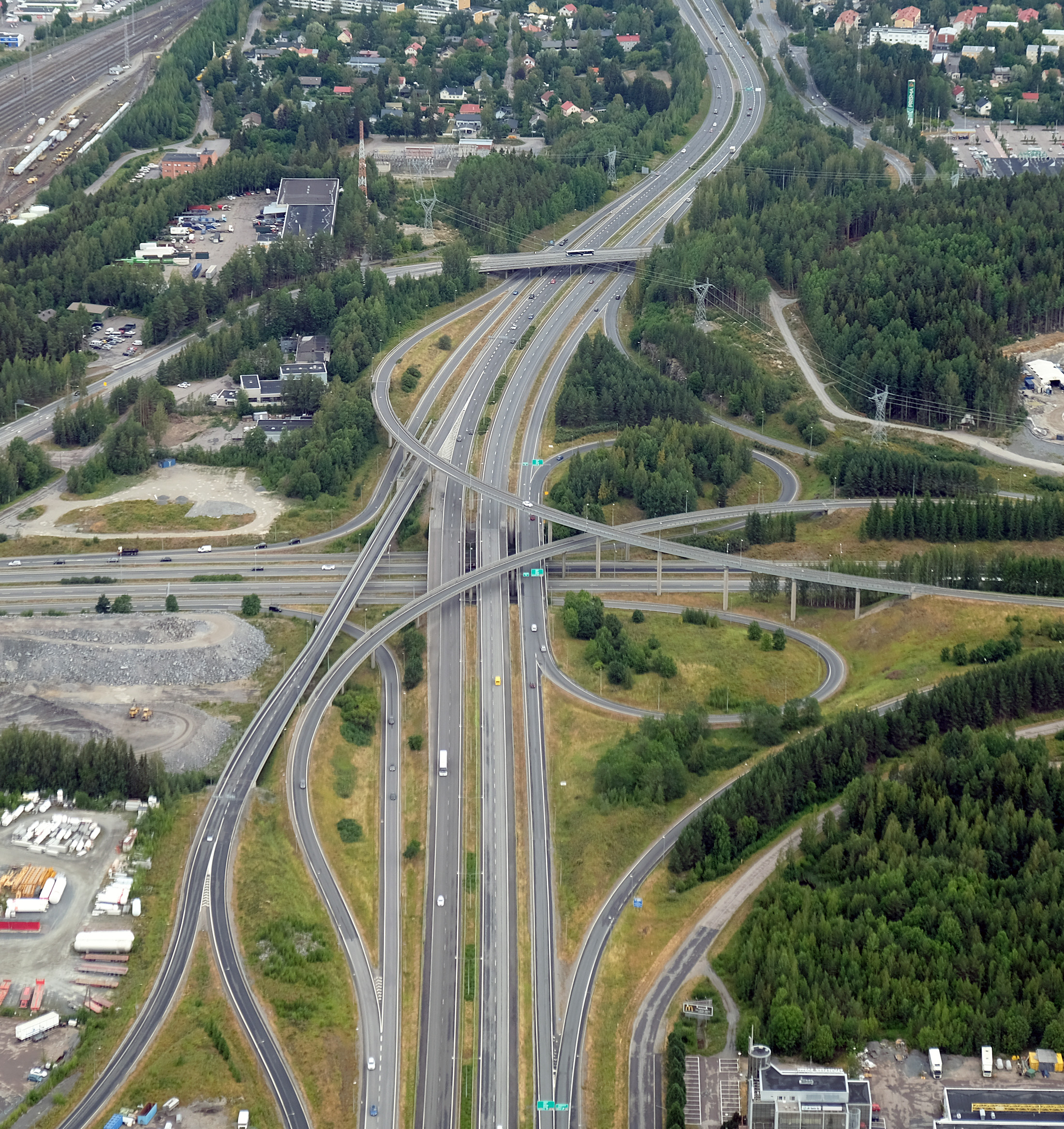
Lakalaiva interchange on the highways 3 (E12) and 9 (E63) in Tampere, Finland.

64% of all traffic on public roads takes place on main roads, which are divided into class I (valtatie/riksväg) and class II (kantatie/stamväg) main roads. Motorways have been constructed in the country since the 1960s, but they are still reasonably rare because traffic volumes are not large enough to motivate their construction. There are 863 kilometres (536 mi) of motorways. Longest stretches are Helsinki–Turku (Main road 1/E18), Vantaa–Ylöjärvi (Main road 3/E12), Helsinki–Heinola (Main road 4/E75), and Helsinki–Vaalimaa (Main road 7/E18). The world's northernmost motorway is also located in Finland between Keminmaa and Tornio (Main road 29/E8).

There are no toll roads in Finland.

=== Speed limits ===
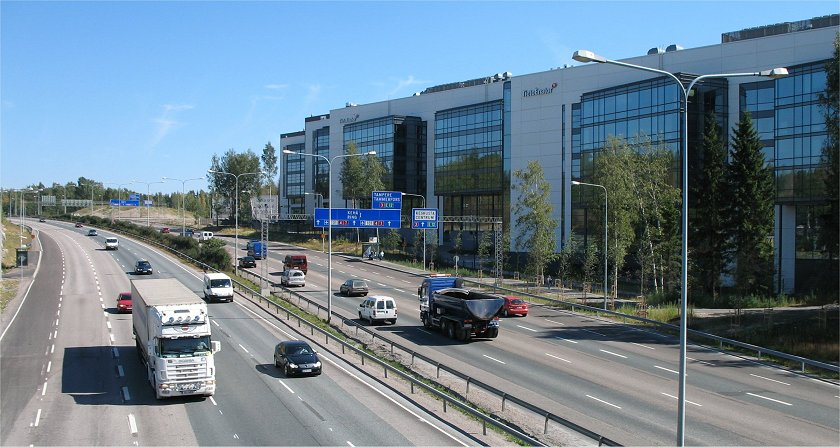
Office buildings line Kehä I in Pohjois-Haaga, Helsinki.

Speed limits change depending on the time of the year; the maximum speed limit on motorways is 120 km/h (75 mph) in the summer and 100 km/h (62 mph) in the winter. The main roads usually have speed limits of either 100 km/h or 80 km/h (50 mph). Speed limits in urban areas range between 30 km/h (19 mph) and 60 km/h (37 mph). If no other speed limit is signposted, the general speed limit in Finland is 50 km/h (31 mph) in built-up areas and 80 km/h (50 mph) outside.

=== Vehicles ===
As of 2013, there are 4,95 million registered automobiles, of which 2,58 million cars. Average age of cars (museum cars excluded) is 12,5 years (in some regions even 15 years), and typically the cars are destroyed in age of 24 years. In 2015, ca. 123 000 new vehicles were registered in Finland. About 550,000–600,000 used automobiles are sold each year in Finland. During 2011–2014 the most sold car brand was Volkswagen. It had a market share of 12% of new cars.

=== Public transport ===
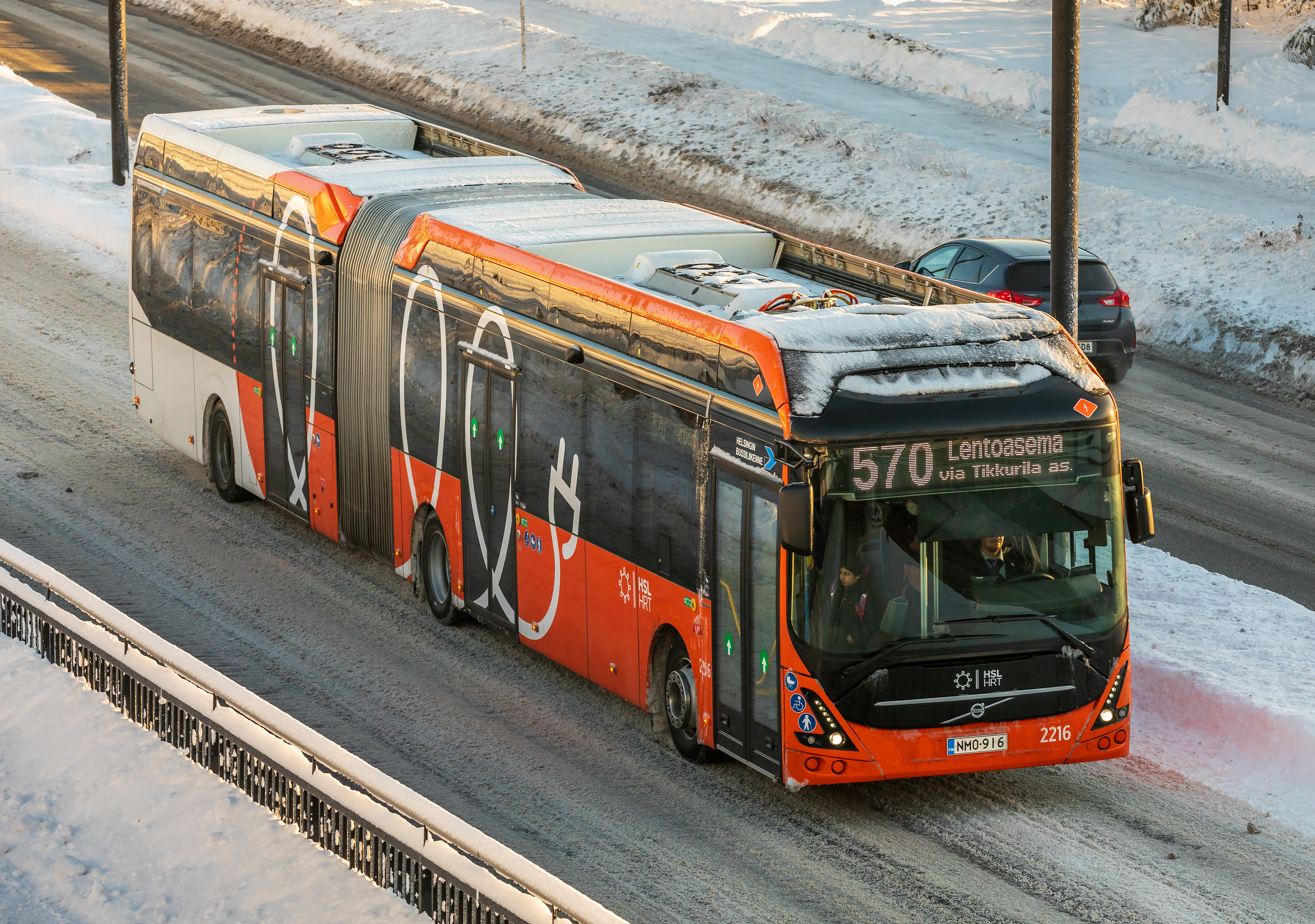
Volvo 7900 Electric Articulated bus 570 to airport operated by HSL in Vantaa, Finland in 2022 December.

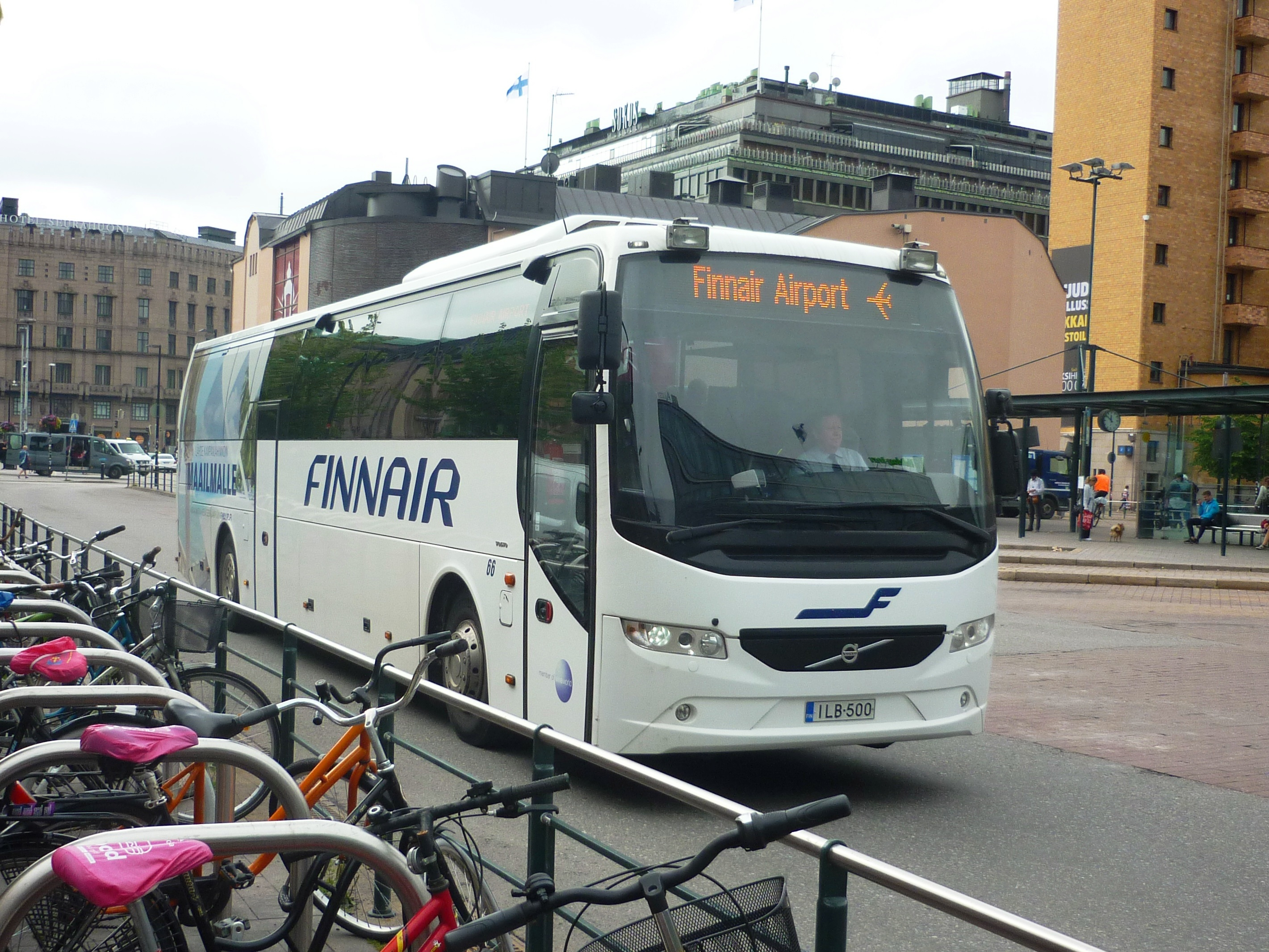
A Finnair bus rushes passengers to Helsinki-Vantaa Airport

Coaches are mainly operated by private companies and provide services widely across the country. There is a large network of ExpressBus services with connections to all major cities and the most important rural areas as well as a burgeoning OnniBus 'cheap bus' network. Coach stations are operated by Matkahuolto.

Local bus services inside cities and towns have often been tightly regulated by the councils. Many councils also have their own bus operators, such as Tampere City Transit (TKL), which operates some bus lines on a commercial basis in competition with privately owned providers. Regional bus lines have been regulated by the provincial administration to protect old transit companies, leading to cartel situations like TLO in the Turku region, but strong regional regulating bodies, like the Helsinki Regional Transport Authority (HSL/HRT), whose routes are put out to tender exist as well and will become the norm after the transitional period during the 2010s.

=== Accidents ===
In 2015, number of road traffic accidents involving personal injury was 5,164. In them, 266 persons were killed. The number of road deaths per million inhabitants is just below the European average. Traffic safety has improved significantly since the early 1970s, when more than one thousand people died in road traffic every year.

=== Parking ===
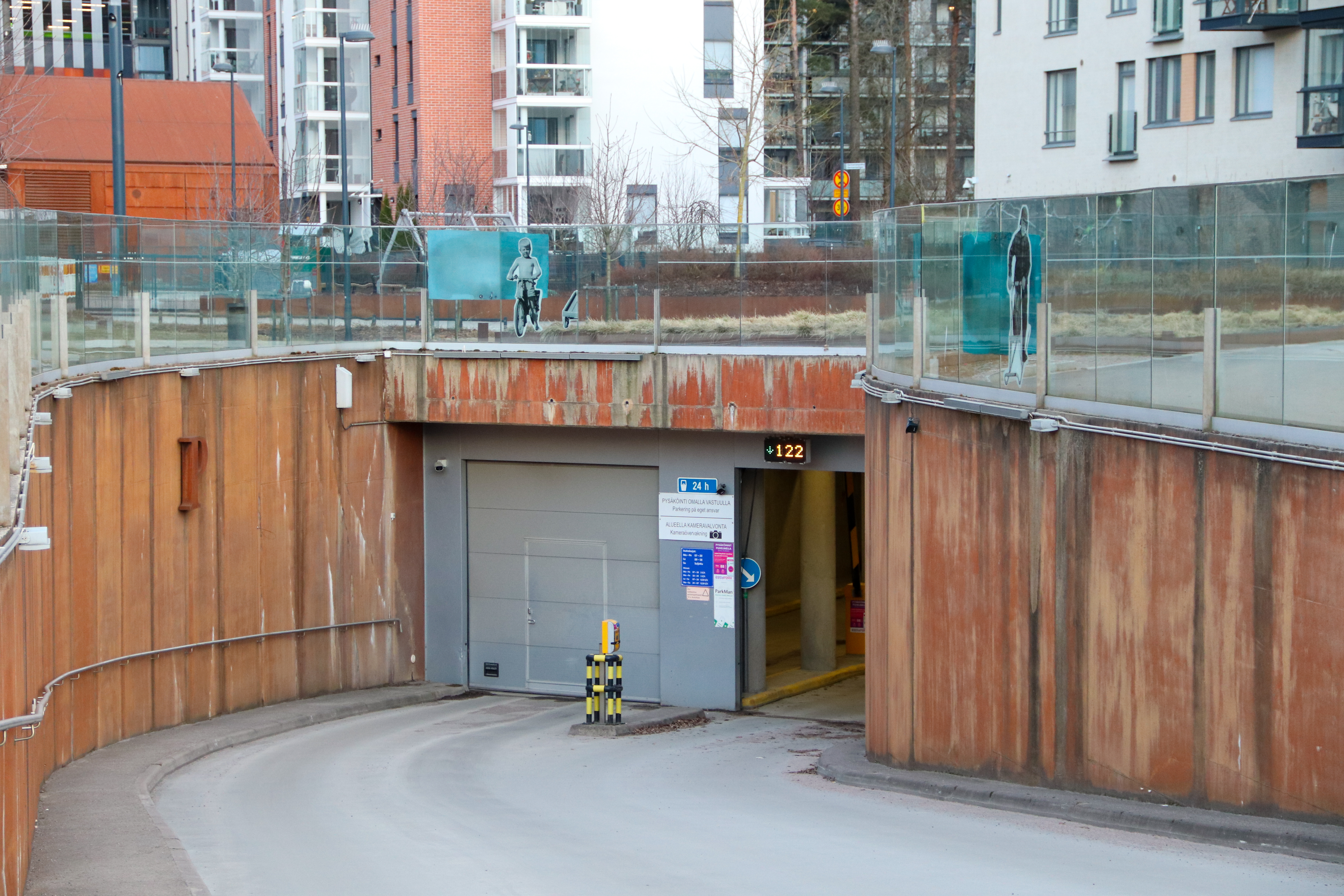
Underground parking of noticeable size near Tikkurila railway station

Municipal law 30-31 § gives right to Referendum since year 1990. Citizens of Turku collected 15,000 names in one month for referendum against the underground car park. Politicians with in the elections unknown financing from the parking company neglected the citizens opinion. According to International Association of Public Transport UITP parking places are among the most effective ways to promote private car use in the city. Therefore, many European cities have cancelled the expensive underground car parking after the 1990s. The EU recommended actions cover develop guidance for concrete measures for the internalisation of external costs for car traffic also in urban areas. In Finland the shops routinely offer free parking for private cars.

== Cycling ==
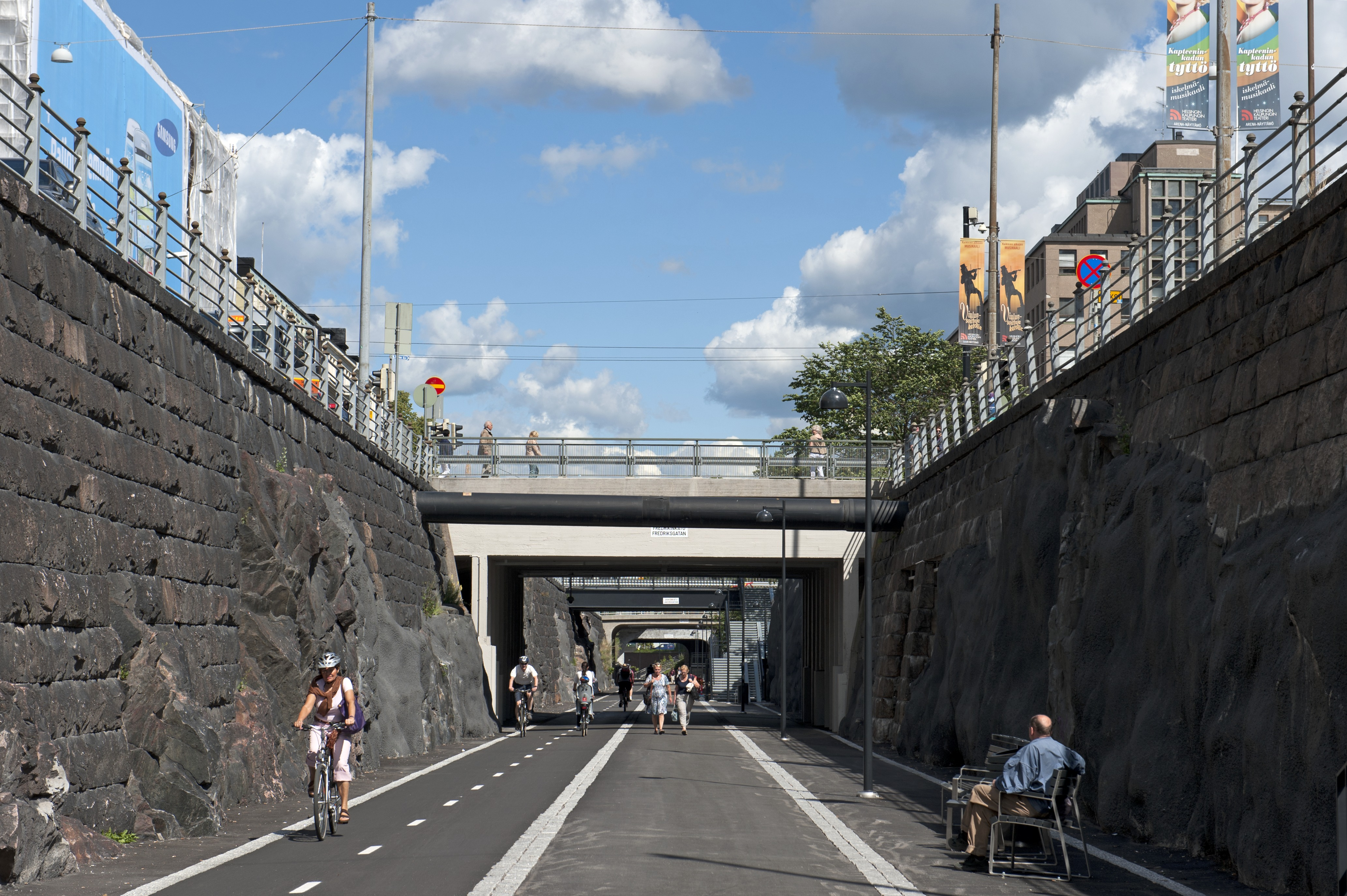
Light traffic thoroughfare Baana

In Finland, 13% of the population reports cycling as their primary form of transportation. In 2016, the first bicycle-sharing system, Helsinki City Bikes, opened in Finland.

== Rail transport ==
=== Railways ===
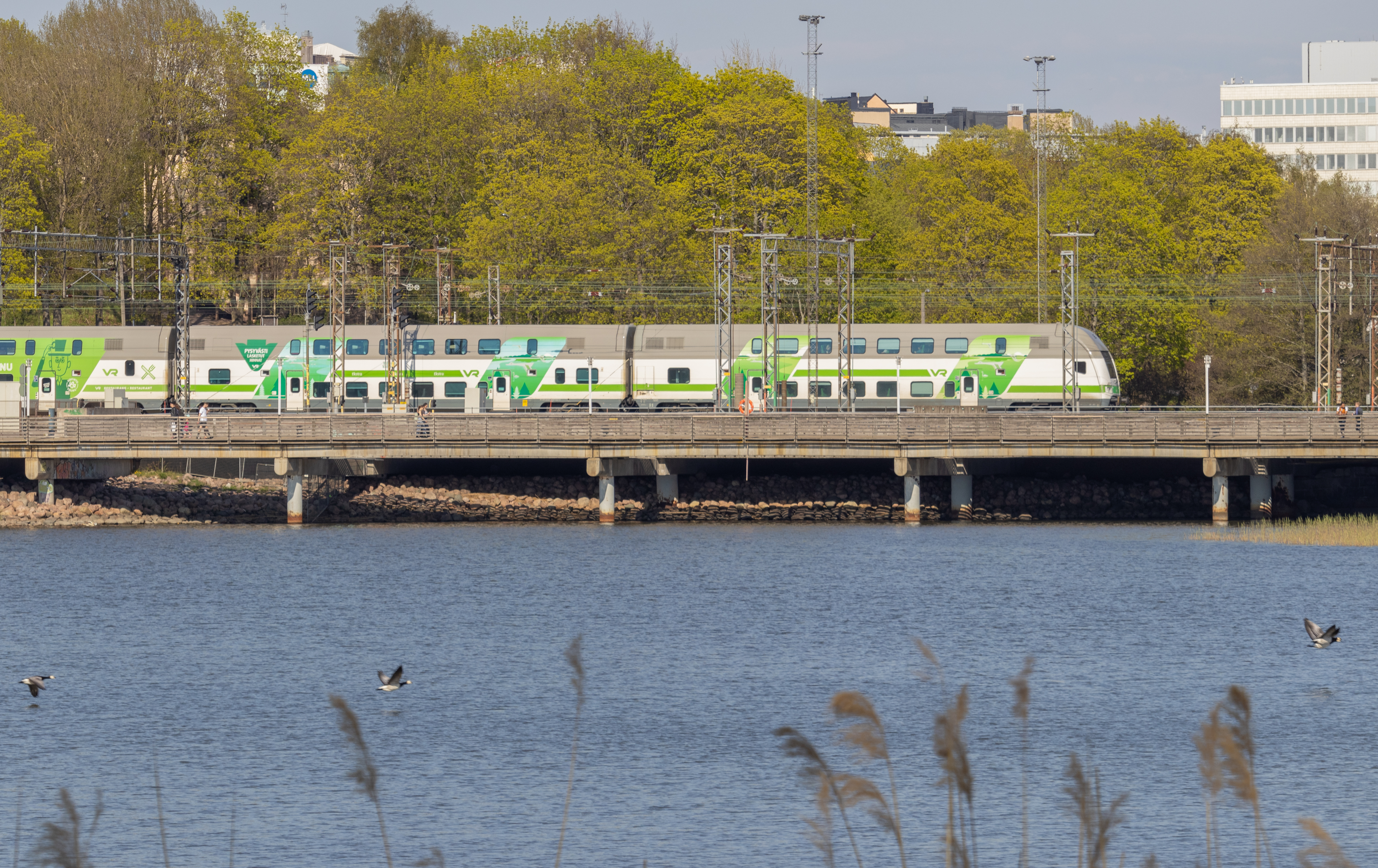
A double-decker InterCity 2 train on a bridge near central station in Helsinki.

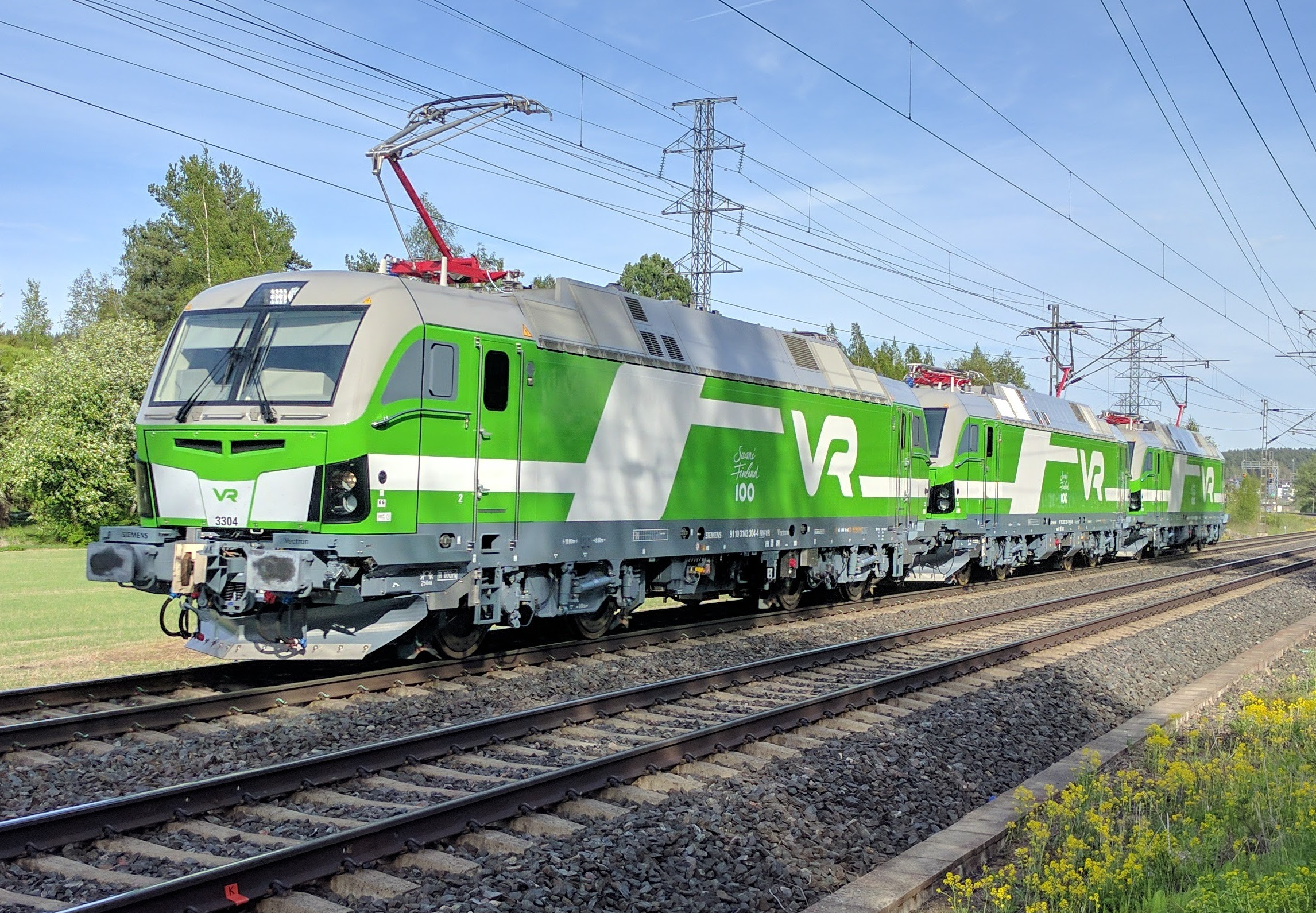
A new Swiss made VR Class Sr3 locomotives.

The Finnish railway network consists of a total of 5,919 kilometres (3,678 mi) of railways built with 1,524 mm (5 ft). 3,072 km (1,909 mi) of track is electrified. In 2010, passengers made 13.4 million long-distance voyages and 55.5 million trips in local traffic. On the same year, over 35,000,000 tonnes (34,000,000 long tons; 39,000,000 short tons) of freight were transported.

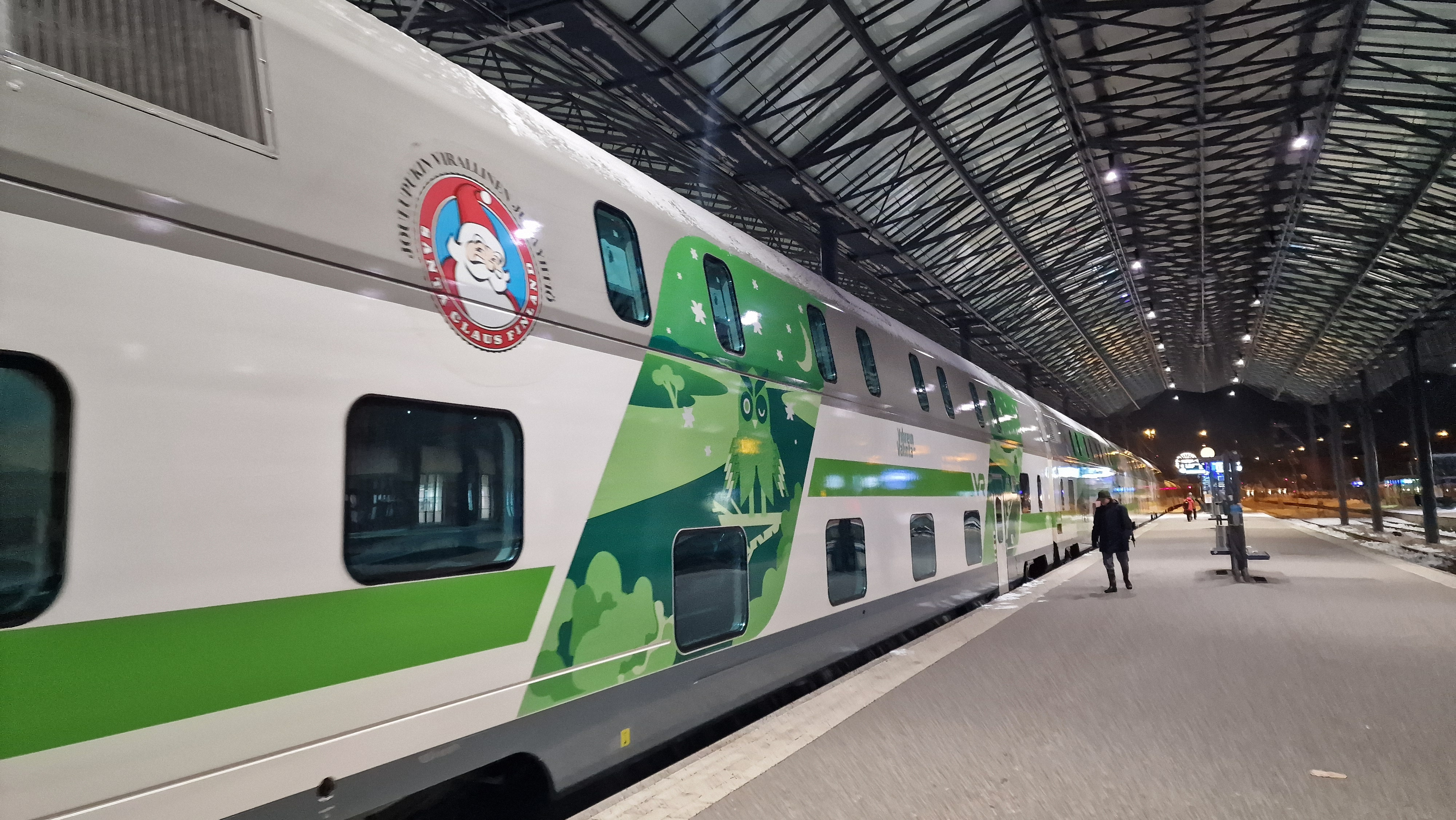
Santa Express sleeper train to Rovaniemi

Finland's first railway was opened between Helsinki and Hämeenlinna in 1862, and today it forms part of the Finnish Main Line (päärata), which is more than 800 kilometers long. Nowadays, passenger trains are operated by the state-owned VR. They serve all the major cities and many rural areas, complemented by bus connections where needed. Most passenger train services originate or terminate at Helsinki Central railway station, and a large proportion of the passenger rail network radiates out of Helsinki. High-speed Pendolino services are operated from Helsinki to other major cities like Jyväskylä, Joensuu, Kuopio, Oulu, Tampere and Turku. Modern InterCity services complement the Pendolino network, and cheaper and older long and short-distance trains operate in areas with fewer passengers.

The Helsinki area has three urban rail systems: a tramway, a metro, and a commuter rail system. Light rail systems are currently being planned for Helsinki and also for Turku and Tampere, two of the country's other major urban centres.

=== Metro ===
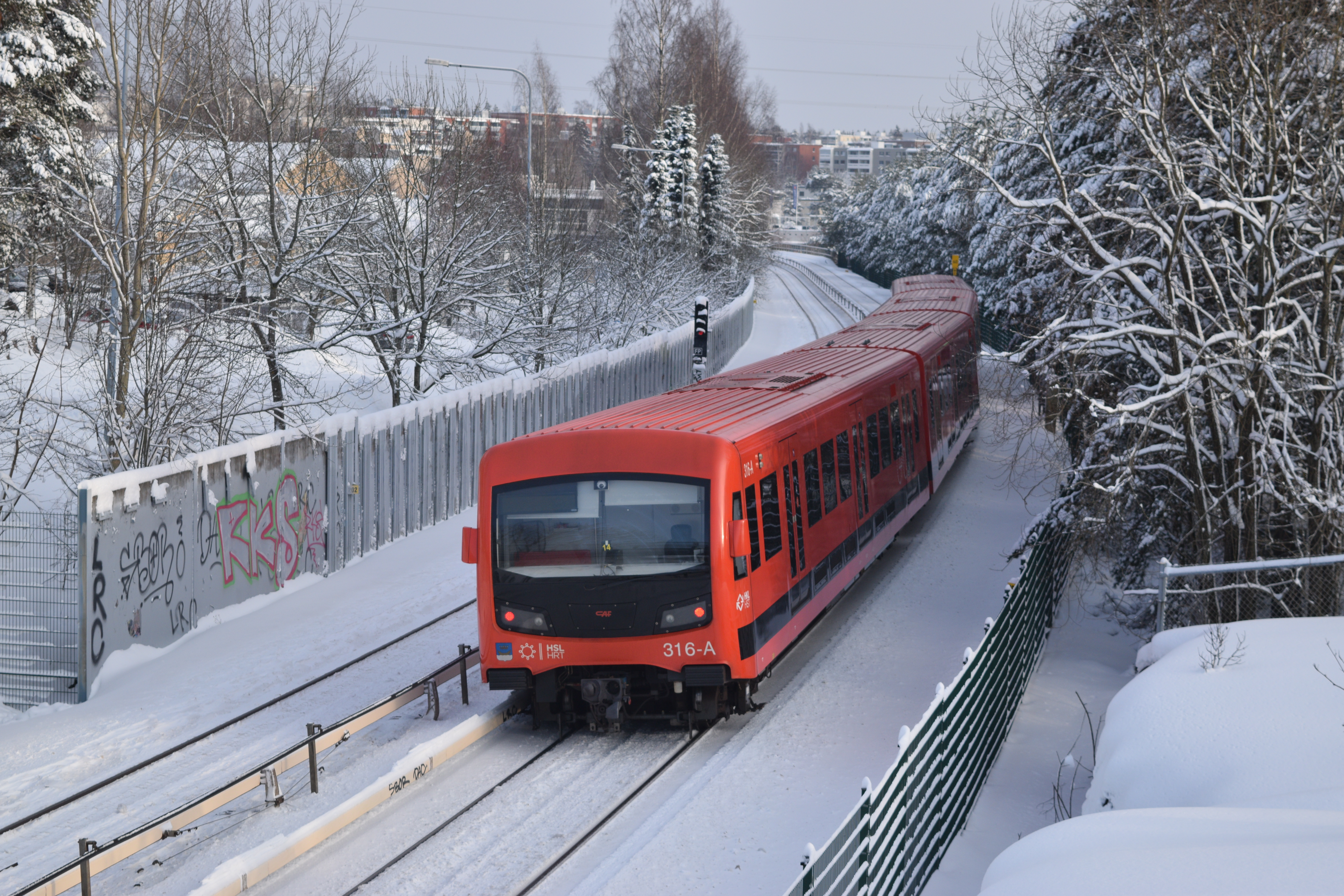
HKL Class M300 use on the Helsinki Metro

The Helsinki metro is a 43-kilometer broad-gauge metro system that connects the center of Helsinki with the eastern districts and the western Espoo. The capital region has the northernmost metro system in the world and the only one in Finland. The Helsinki metro was opened on August 2, 1982, initially between Rautatientori and Itäkeskus. On November 18, 2017, Länsimetro extended the metro lines from the inner city to the west, via Lauttasaari to Tapiola and Matinkylä, and on December 3, 2022, all the way to Kivenlahti.

=== High-speed rail ===
There are plans to link Helsinki to Turku and Tampere by high-speed lines resulting in journey times of an hour between the capital and the two cities. A link to Kouvola is also planned. The estimated cost of these lines is €10 billion.

=== Trams and light rail ===
In Finland there have been two cities with trams: Helsinki and Tampere. Of the older systems only Helsinki has retained its tramway network. The trams in Viipuri, having been lost to Soviet Union in 1945, ceased operations in 1957, while the Turku tramway network shut down in 1972.

In November 2016, Tampere city council approved the construction of a new light rail system. Construction of phase 1 begun late 2016 and finished in 2021. Tampere trams are already operating but the official opening date is 9 August 2021. Turku also has preliminary plans for new tram system, but no decision to build it has been made.

Helsinki currently operates 10 tramlines on a network of approximately 90 kilometres (56 mi) of track in passenger service. The trams have annually 57 million passengers.

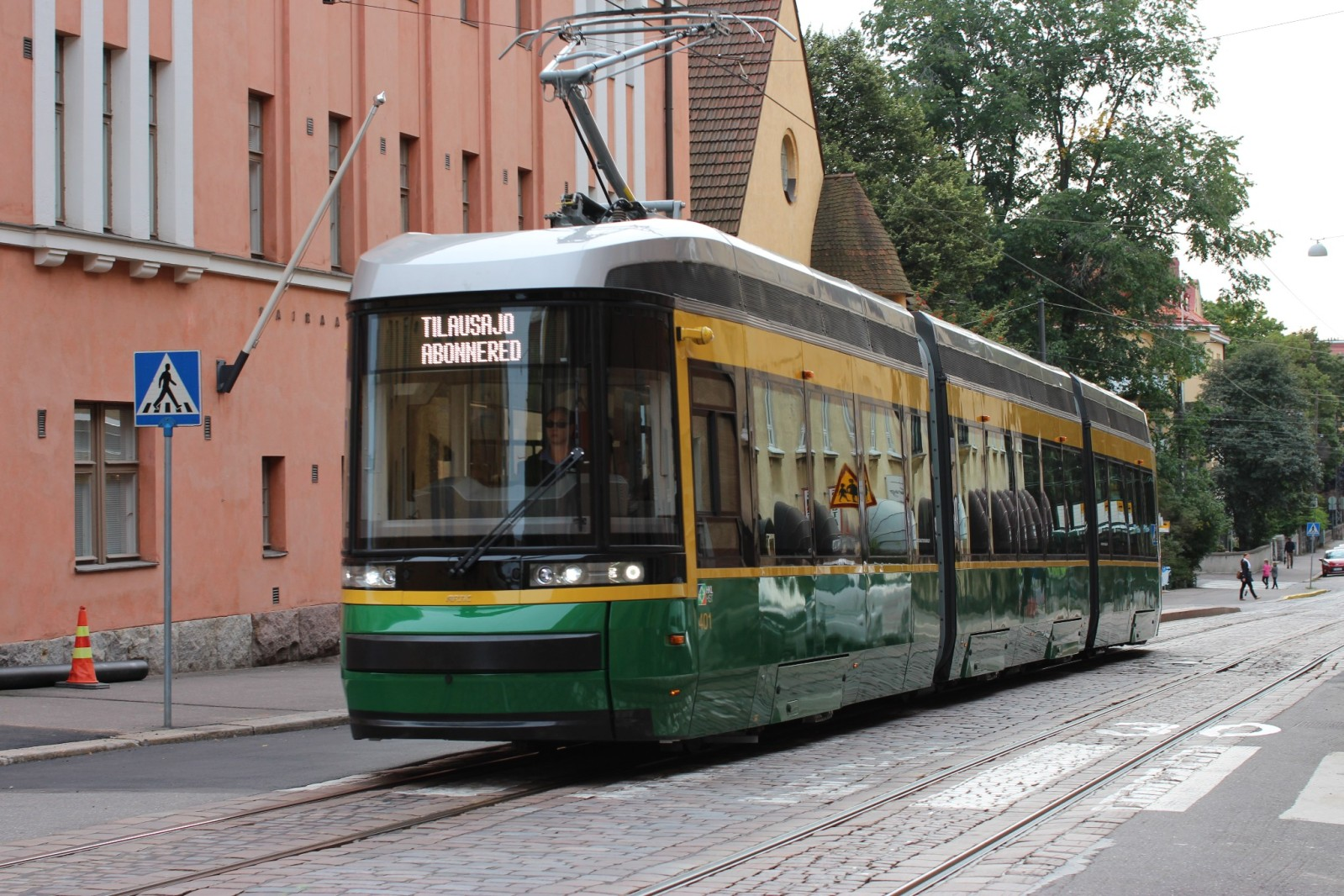
New Škoda Artic tram in Helsinki

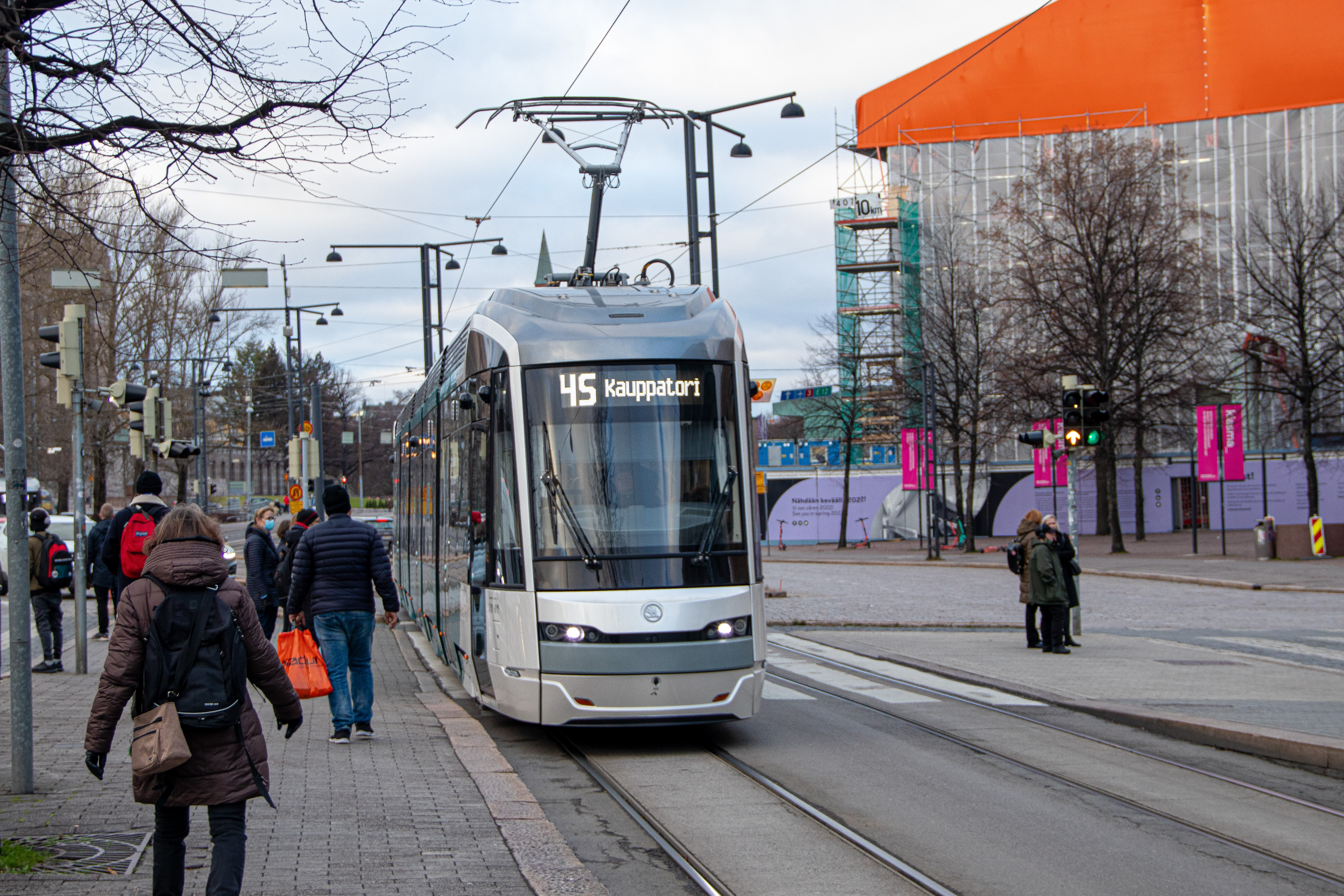
NewThe Artic XL tram in Helsinki

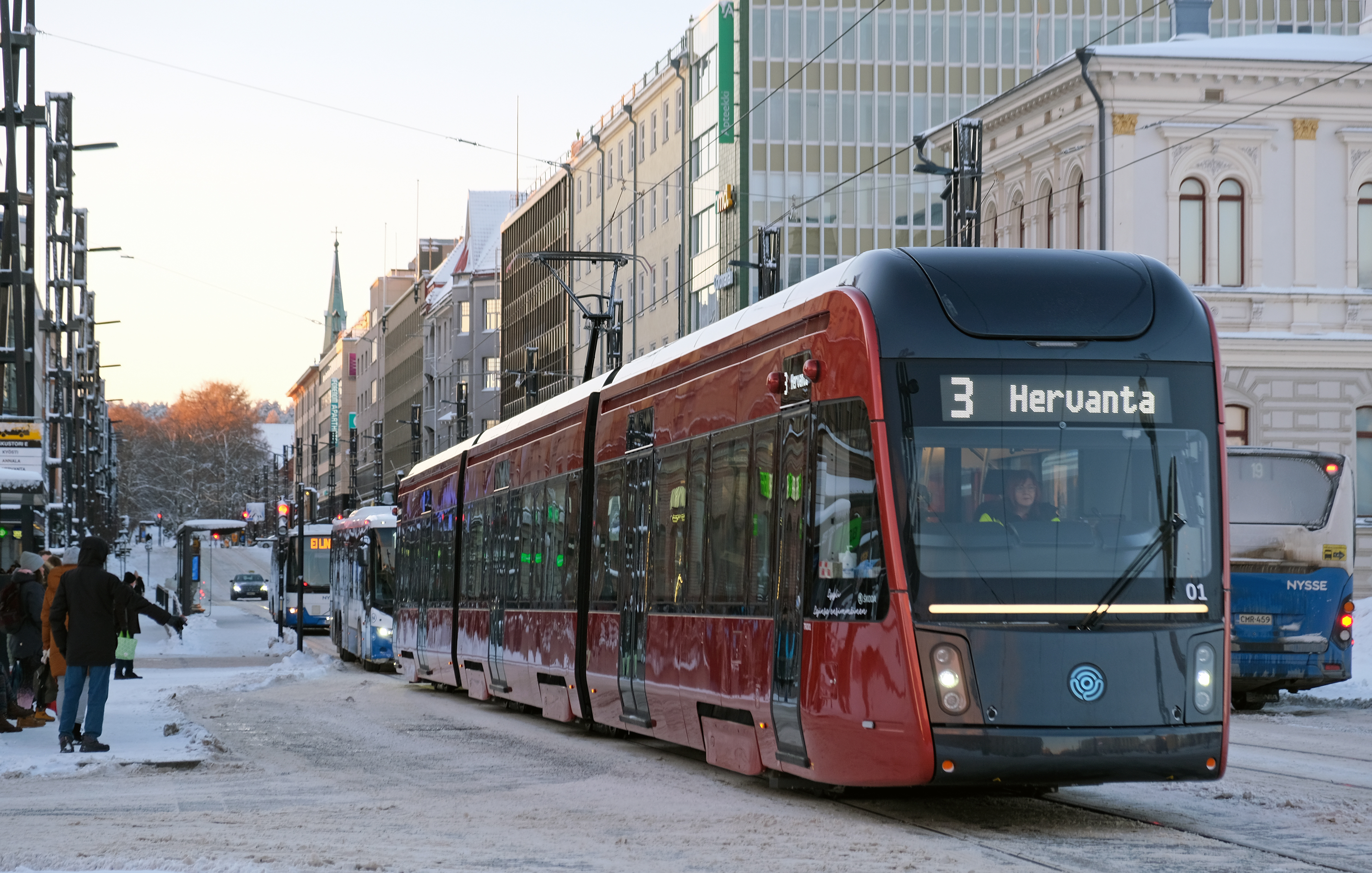
New Škoda Artic tram in Tampere

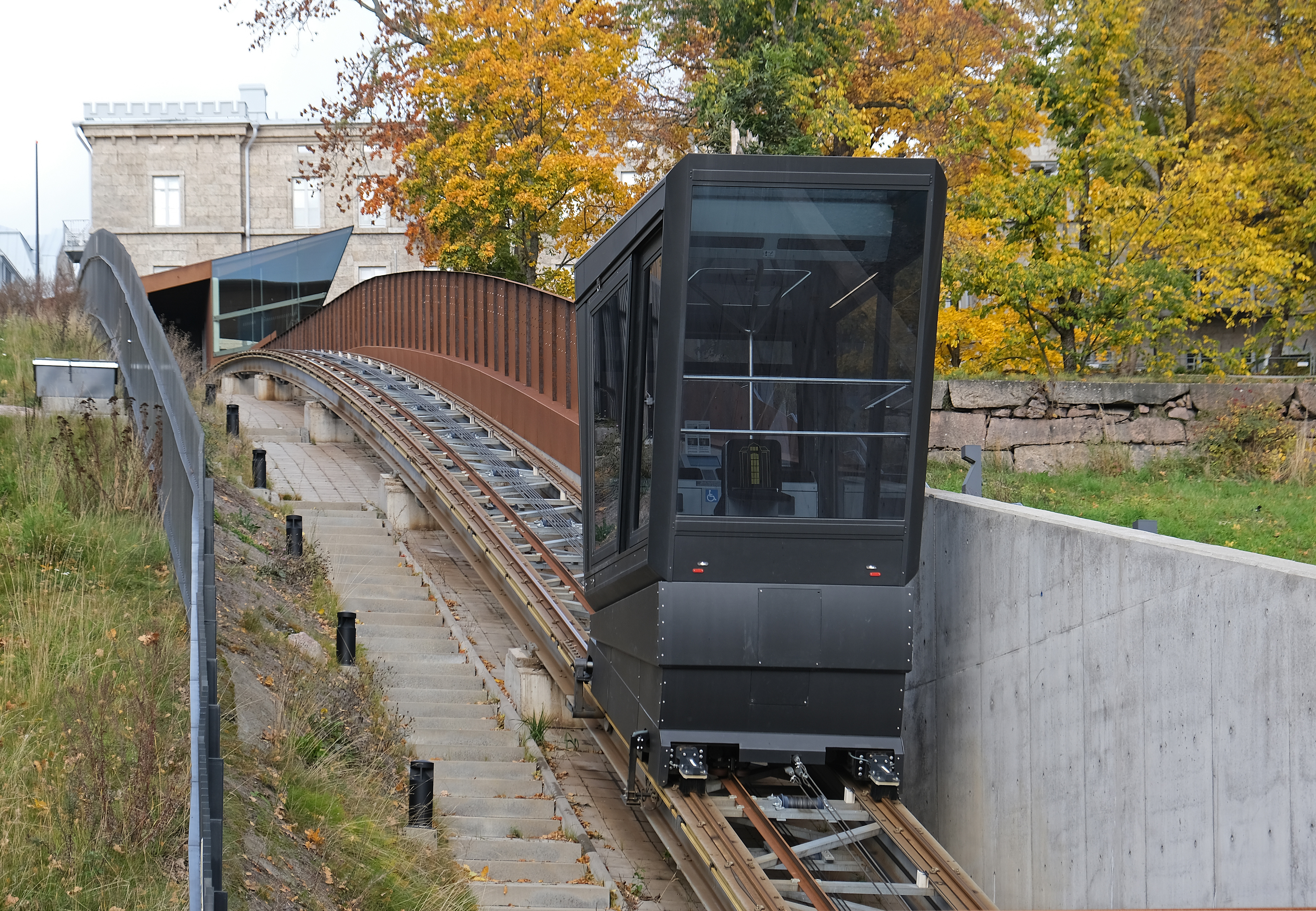
Funicular in Turku

== Air transport ==
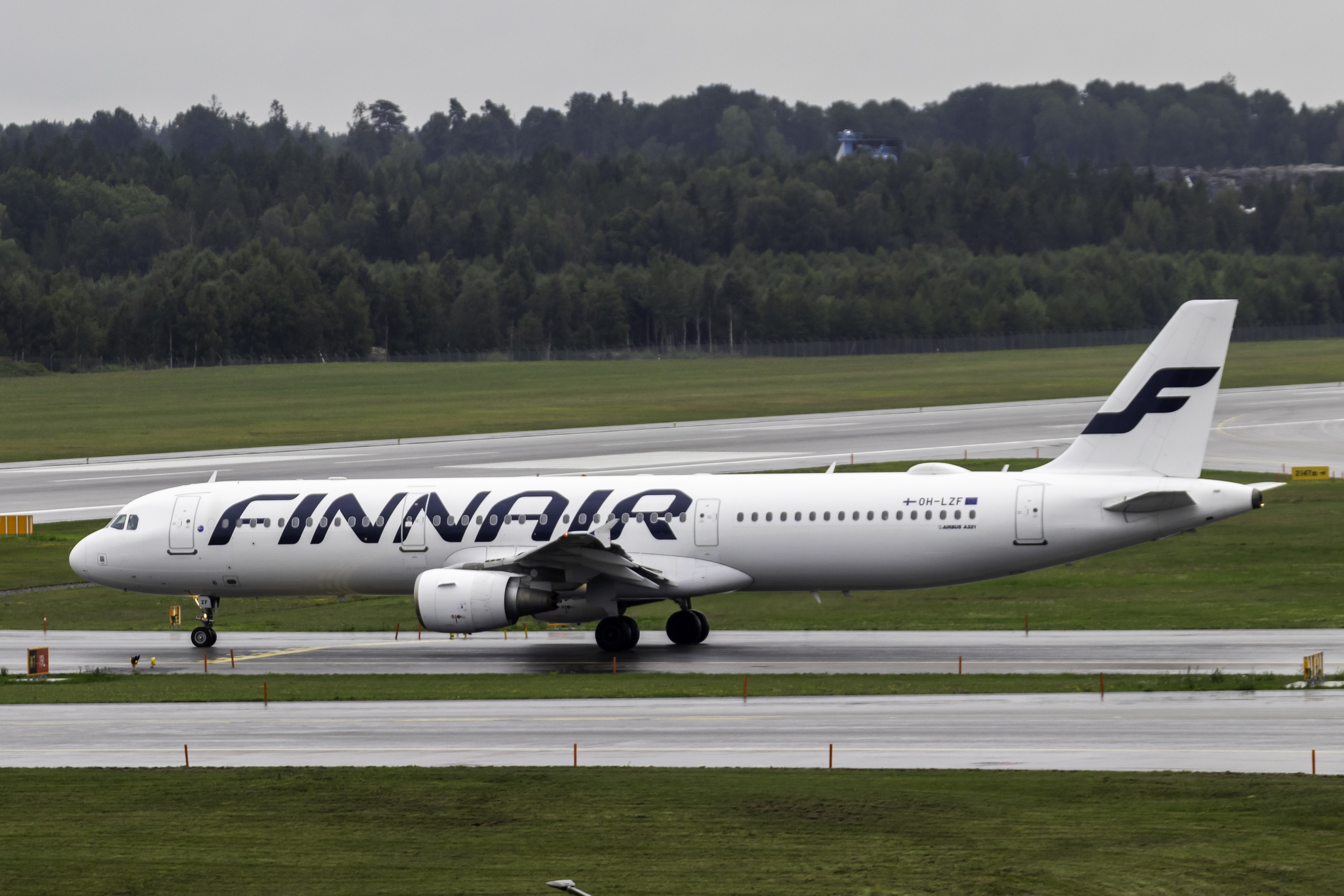
Finnair Airbus A321

There are 148 airfields, 74 of which have paved runways. 21 airports are served by scheduled passenger flights. By far the largest airport is Helsinki-Vantaa Airport, and the second largest by passenger volume is Oulu Airport. The larger airports are managed by the state-owned Finavia (formerly the Finnish Civil Aviation Administration). Finnair, Nordic Regional Airlines and Norwegian Air Shuttle are the main carriers for domestic flights.

Helsinki-Vantaa airport is Finland's global gateway with scheduled non-stop flights to such places as Bangkok, Beijing, Guangzhou, Nagoya, New York, Osaka, Shanghai, Hong Kong and Tokyo. Helsinki has an optimal location for great circle airline traffic routes between Western Europe and the Far East. The airport is located approximately 19 kilometers north of Helsinki's downtown in the city of Vantaa, thus the name Helsinki-Vantaa.

Other airports with regular scheduled international connections are Kokkola-Pietarsaari Airport, Mariehamn Airport, Rovaniemi Airport, Tampere-Pirkkala Airport, Turku Airport and Vaasa Airport.

== Water transport ==
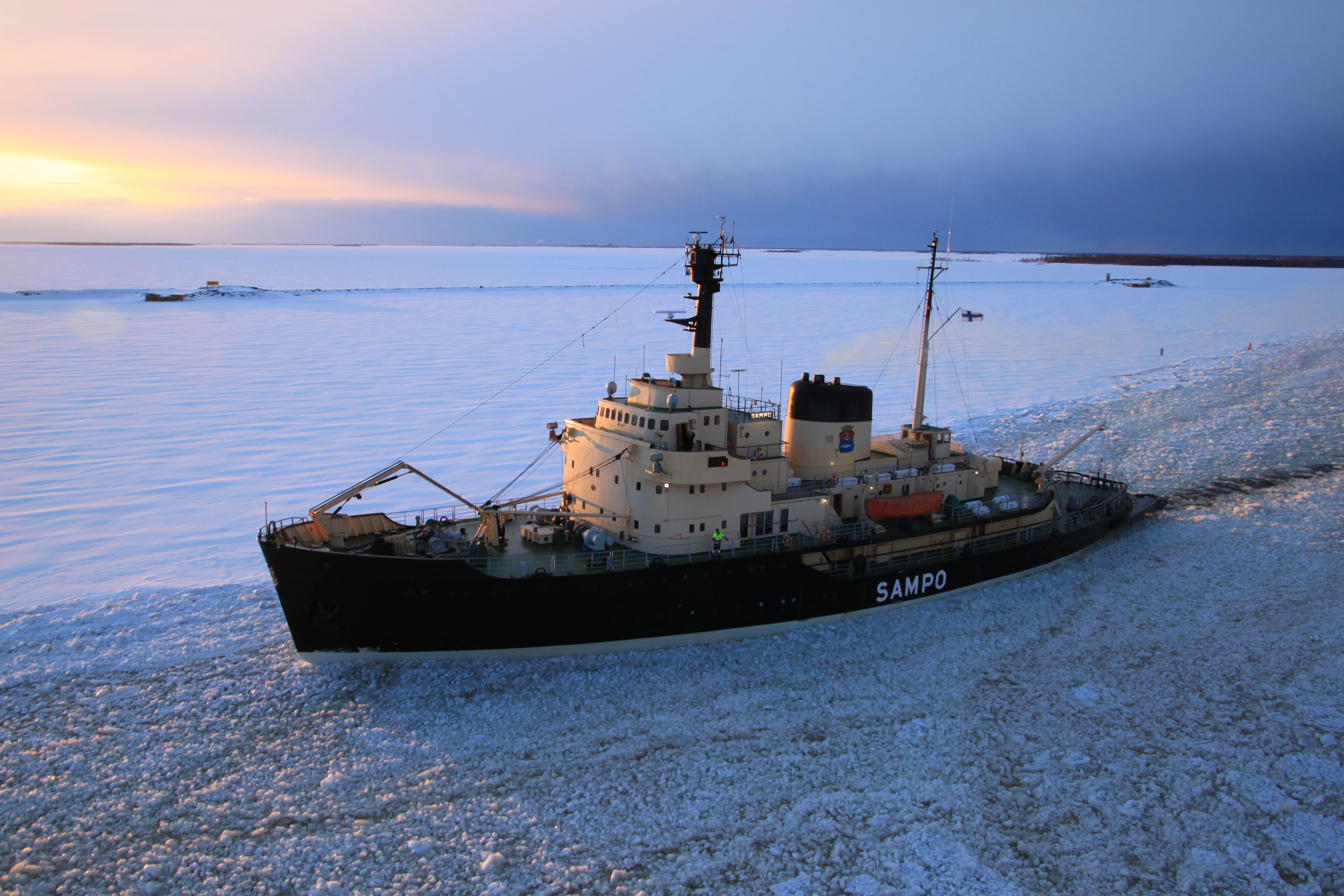
Icebreaker Sampo in Port of Kemi

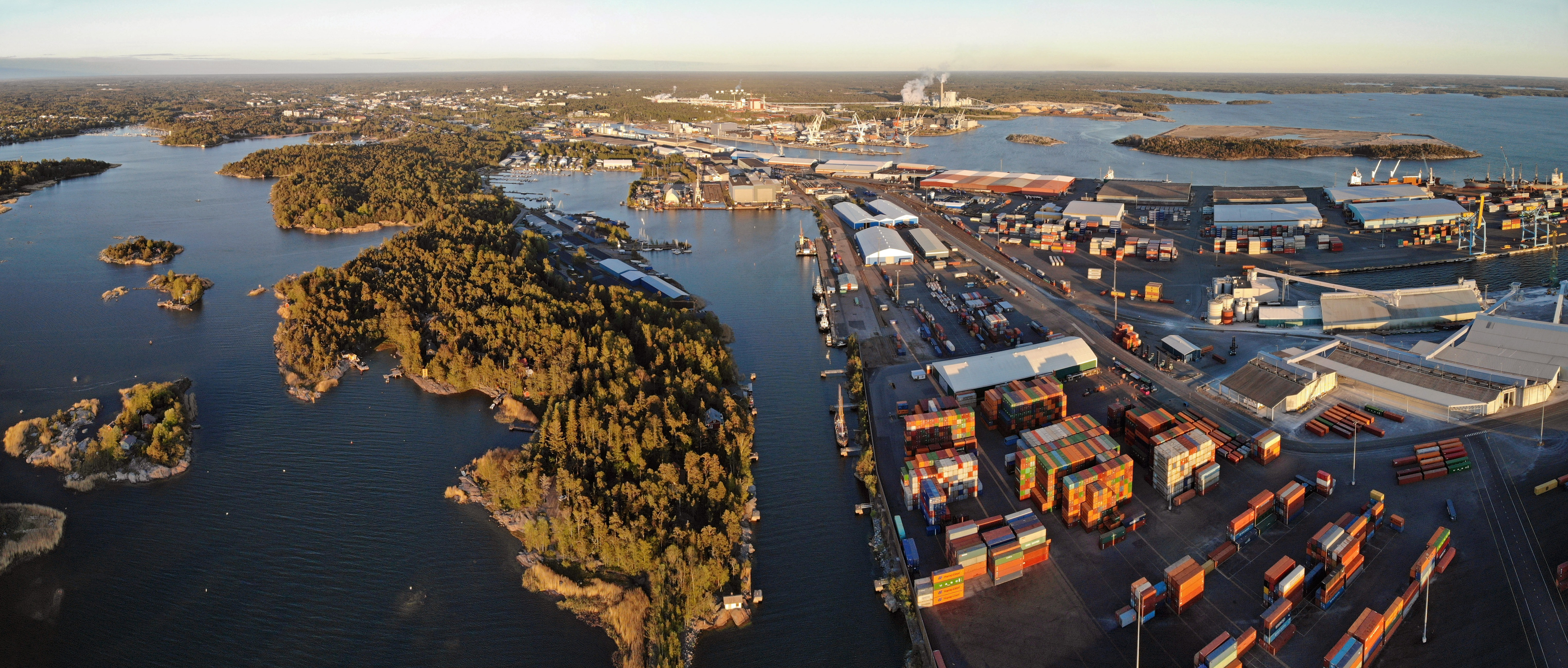
Port of Rauma

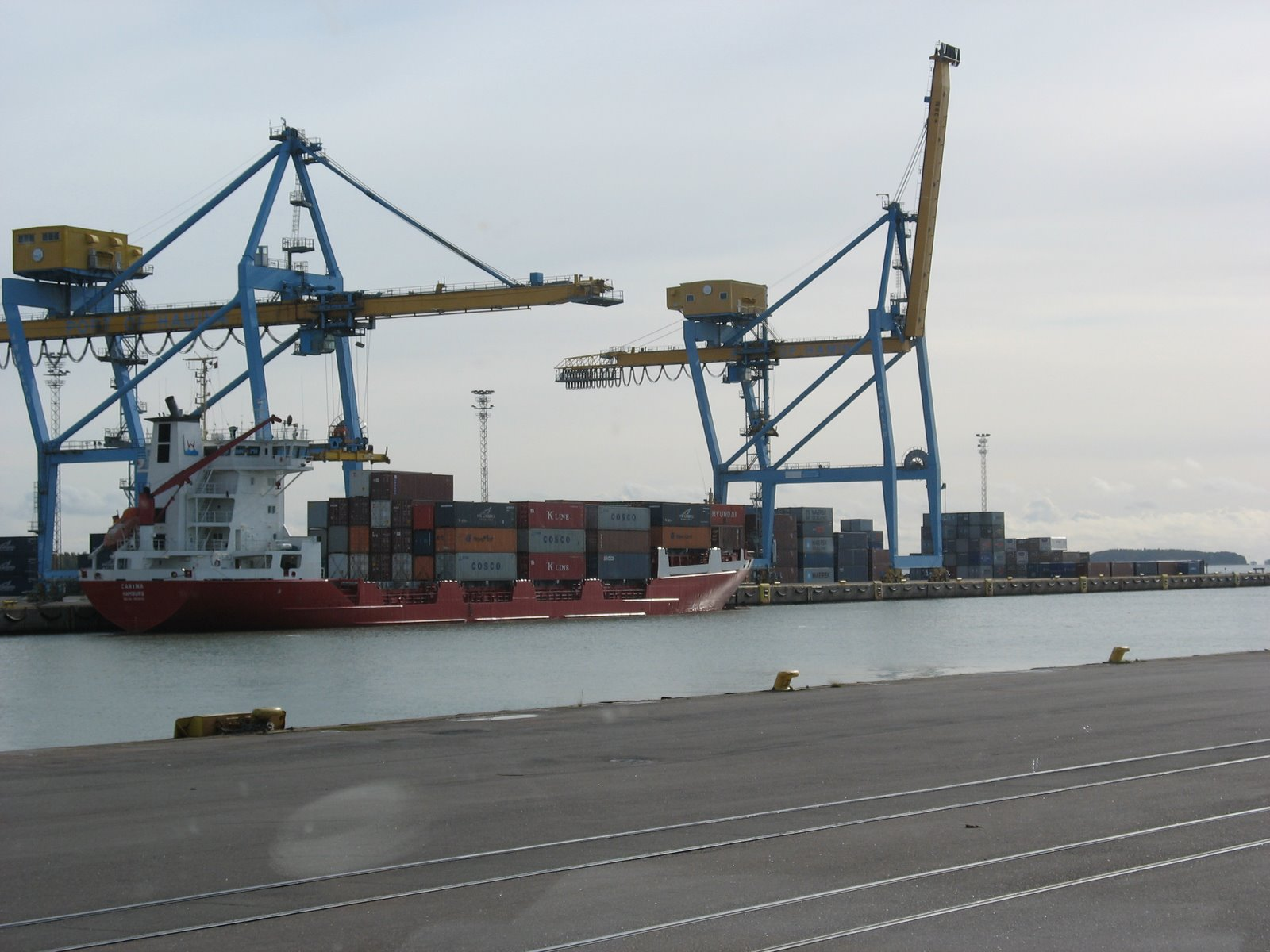
Port of Hamina-Kotka

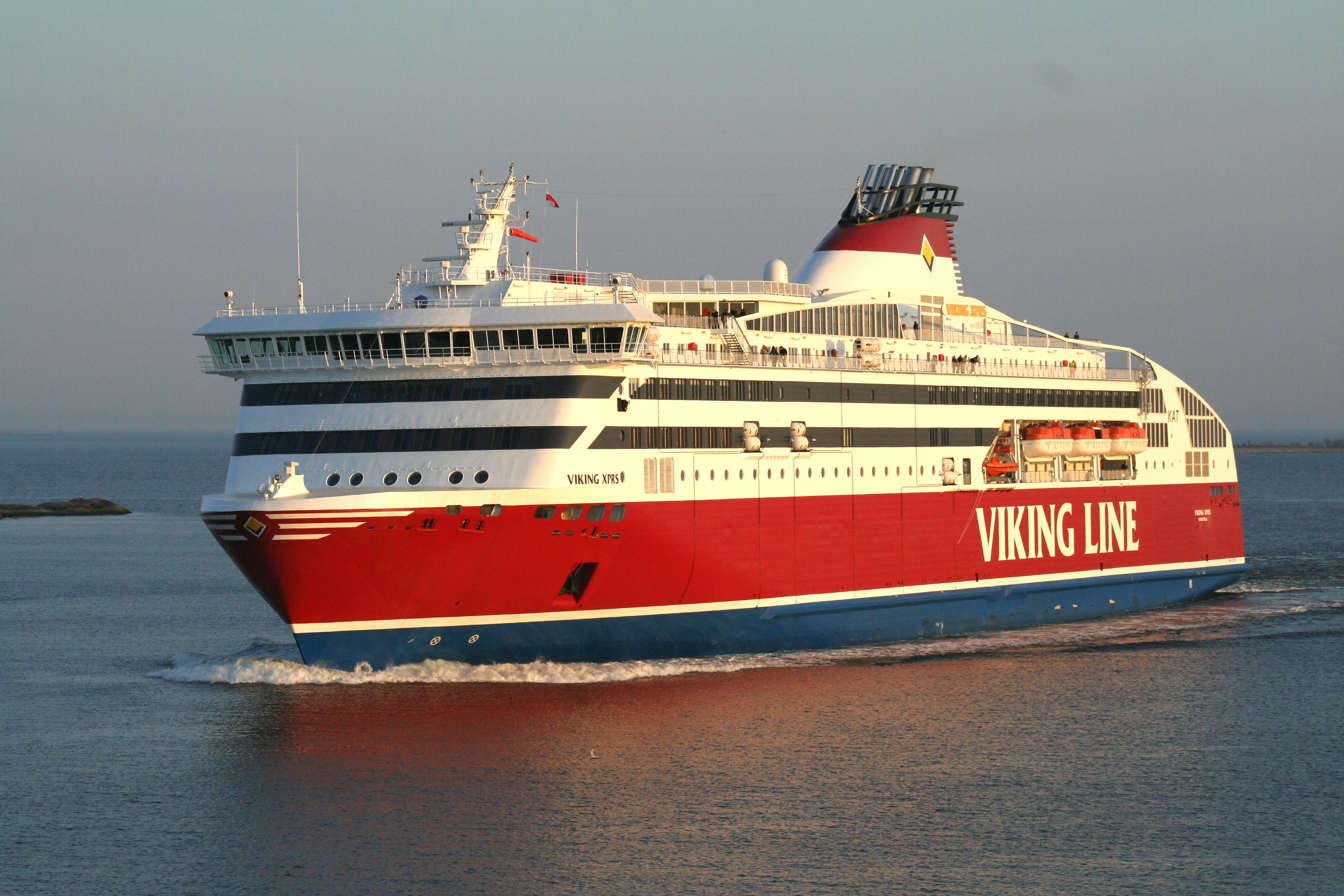
Viking Line is one of several companies operating ferry service between Helsinki and Tallinn.

The Finnish Maritime Administration is responsible for the maintenance of Finland's waterway network. Finland's waterways includes some 7,600 kilometres (4,700 mi) of coastal fairways and 7,900 kilometres (4,900 mi) of Finland waterways (on rivers, canals, and lakes). Saimaa Canal connects Lake Saimaa, and thus much of the inland waterway system of Finland, with the Baltic Sea at Vyborg (Viipuri). However, the lower part of the canal is currently located in Russia. To facilitate through shipping, Finland leases the Russian section of the canal from Russia (the original agreement with the Soviet Union dates to 1963).

The largest general port is Port of Hamina-Kotka. Port of Helsinki is the busiest passenger harbour, and it also has significant cargo traffic. By cargo tons, the five busiest ports are Hamina-Kotka, Helsinki, Rauma, Kilpilahti and Naantali.

Icebreakers keep 23 ports open for traffic even in winter. The ports in Gulf of Bothnia need icebreakers in average six months a year, while in Gulf of Finland icebreakers are needed for three months a year.

Frequent ferry service connects Finland with Estonia and Sweden. Baltic cruise liners regularly call on the port of Helsinki as well. In domestic service, ferries connect Finland's islands with the mainland. Finland's cargo ports move freight both for Finland's own needs and for transshipment to Russia.

=== Waterways and canals ===
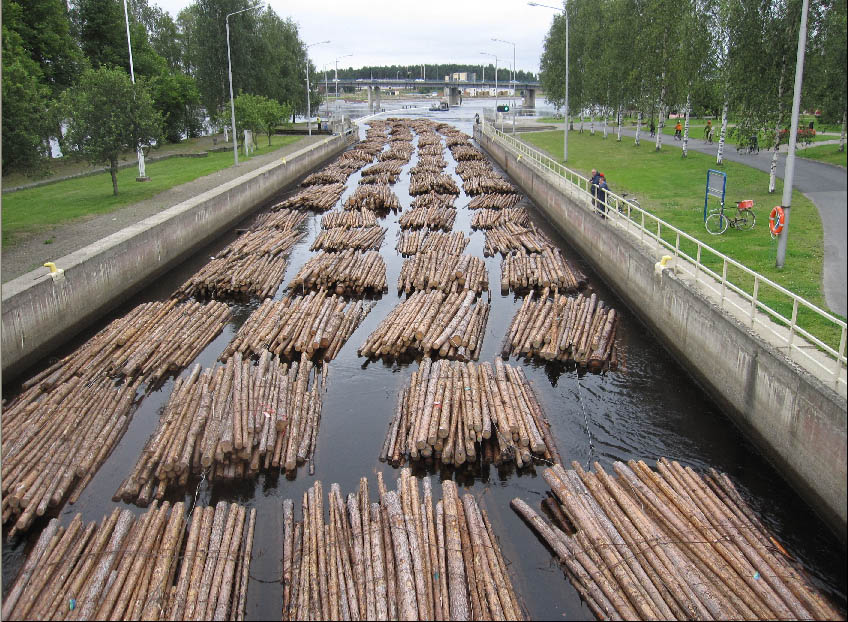
Timber floating on Joensuu

Finland's canals are primarily located in inland waters. The canals of the Finnish sea area are mostly made for small boating. In terms of water traffic, a significant reason for canalization has been floating operations. For water management, canals have been built especially for Log driving and hydropower projects.

In order to lower and drain Lake Pohjalanjärvi, the depression of Rautajoki was deepened by canalization. The Finnish Waterways Association was founded in 1981 to promote the development of waterways and the construction of canals.

== See also ==
- Finnish models of public transport
- Plug-in electric vehicles in Finland
