= Qualitative economics =

Qualitative economics is the representation and analysis of information about the direction of change (+, -, or 0) in some economic variable(s) as related to change of some other economic variable(s). For the non-zero case, what makes the change qualitative is that its direction but not its magnitude is specified.

Typical exercises of qualitative economics include comparative-static changes studied in microeconomics or macroeconomics and comparative equilibrium-growth states in a macroeconomic growth model. A simple example illustrating qualitative change is from macroeconomics. Let:

GDP = nominal gross domestic product, a measure of national income
M = money supply
T = total taxes.

Monetary theory hypothesizes a positive relationship between GDP the dependent variable and M the independent variable. Equivalent ways to represent such a qualitative relationship between them are as a signed functional relationship and as a signed derivative:

$GDP = f(\overset{+}{M}) \quad\!$ or $\quad\frac{ df(M) }{ dM} > 0.$

where the '+' indexes a positive relationship of GDP to M, that is, as M increases, GDP increases as a result.

Another model of GDP hypothesizes that GDP has a negative relationship to T. This can be represented similarly to the above, with a theoretically appropriate sign change as indicated:

$GDP = f(\overset{-}{T}) \quad\!$ or $\quad\frac{ df(T)}{ dT} < 0.$

That is, as T increases, GDP decreases as a result. A combined model uses both M and T as independent variables. The hypothesized relationships can be equivalently represented as signed functional relationships and signed partial derivatives (suitable for more than one independent variable):

$GDP = f(\overset{+}{M},\overset{-}{ T}) \,\! \quad$ or $\quad\frac{\partial f(M, T)}{\partial M} > 0,\quad$ $\frac{\partial f(M, T)}{\partial T} < 0.$

Qualitative hypotheses occur in earliest history of formal economics but only as to formal economic models from the late 1930s with Hicks's model of general equilibrium in a competitive economy. A classic exposition of qualitative economics is Samuelson, 1947. There Samuelson identifies qualitative restrictions and the hypotheses of maximization and stability of equilibrium as the three fundamental sources of meaningful theorems — hypotheses about empirical data that could conceivably be refuted by empirical data.
