= Comparative statics =

Thought experiments

In this graph, comparative statics shows an increase in demand causing a rise in price and quantity. Comparing two equilibrium states, comparative statics does not describe how the increases actually occur.

In economics, comparative statics is the comparison of two different economic outcomes, before and after a change in some underlying exogenous parameter.

As a type of static analysis it compares two different equilibrium states, after the process of adjustment (if any). It does not study the motion towards equilibrium, nor the process of the change itself.

Comparative statics is commonly used to study changes in supply and demand when analyzing a single market, and to study changes in monetary or fiscal policy when analyzing the whole economy. Comparative statics is a tool of analysis in microeconomics (including general equilibrium analysis) and macroeconomics. Comparative statics was formalized by John R. Hicks (1939) and Paul A. Samuelson (1947) (Kehoe, 1987, p. 517) but was presented graphically from at least the 1870s.

For models of stable equilibrium rates of change, such as the neoclassical growth model, comparative dynamics is the counterpart of comparative statics (Eatwell, 1987).

== Linear approximation ==
Comparative statics results are usually derived by using the implicit function theorem to calculate a linear approximation to the system of equations that defines the equilibrium, under the assumption that the equilibrium is stable. That is, if we consider a sufficiently small change in some exogenous parameter, we can calculate how each endogenous variable changes using only the first derivatives of the terms that appear in the equilibrium equations.

For example, suppose the equilibrium value of some endogenous variable $x$ is determined by the following equation:

$$f(x,a)=0 \,$$

where $a$ is an exogenous parameter. Then, to a first-order approximation, the change in $x$ caused by a small change in $a$ must satisfy:

$$B \text{d}x + C \text{d}a = 0.$$

Here $\text{d}x$ and $\text{d}a$ represent the changes in $x$ and $a$, respectively, while $B$ and $C$ are the partial derivatives of $f$ with respect to $x$ and $a$ (evaluated at the initial values of $x$ and $a$), respectively. Equivalently, we can write the change in $x$ as:

$$\text{d}x = -B^{-1}C \text{d}a .$$

Dividing through the last equation by da gives the comparative static derivative of x with respect to a, also called the multiplier of a on x:

$$\frac{{\text{d}x}}{{\text{d}a}} = -B^{-1}C.$$

=== Many equations and unknowns ===
All the equations above remain true in the case of a system of $n$ equations in $n$ unknowns. In other words, suppose $f(x,a)=0$ represents a system of $n$ equations involving the vector of $n$ unknowns $x$, and the vector of $m$ given parameters $a$. If we make a sufficiently small change $\text{d}a$ in the parameters, then the resulting changes in the endogenous variables can be approximated arbitrarily well by $\text{d}x = -B^{-1}C \text{d}a$. In this case, $B$ represents the $n$×$n$ matrix of partial derivatives of the functions $f$ with respect to the variables $x$, and $C$ represents the $n$×$m$ matrix of partial derivatives of the functions $f$ with respect to the parameters $a$. (The derivatives in $B$ and $C$ are evaluated at the initial values of $x$ and $a$.) Note that if one wants just the comparative static effect of one exogenous variable on one endogenous variable, Cramer's Rule can be used on the totally differentiated system of equations $B\text{d}x + C \text{d}a \,=0$.

=== Stability ===
The assumption that the equilibrium is stable matters for two reasons. First, if the equilibrium were unstable, a small parameter change might cause a large jump in the value of $x$, invalidating the use of a linear approximation. Moreover, Paul A. Samuelson's correspondence principle states that stability of equilibrium has qualitative implications about the comparative static effects. In other words, knowing that the equilibrium is stable may help us predict whether each of the coefficients in the vector $B^{-1}C$ is positive or negative. Specifically, one of the n necessary and jointly sufficient conditions for stability is that the determinant of the n×n matrix B have a particular sign; since this determinant appears as the denominator in the expression for $B^{-1}$, the sign of the determinant influences the signs of all the elements of the vector $B^{-1}C\text{d} a$ of comparative static effects.

==== An example of the role of the stability assumption ====
Suppose that the quantities demanded and supplied of a product are determined by the following equations:

$$Q^{d}(P) = a + bP$$

$$Q^{s}(P) = c + gP$$

where $Q^{d}$ is the quantity demanded, $Q^{s}$ is the quantity supplied, P is the price, a and c are intercept parameters determined by exogenous influences on demand and supply respectively, b < 0 is the reciprocal of the slope of the demand curve, and g is the reciprocal of the slope of the supply curve; g > 0 if the supply curve is upward sloped, g = 0 if the supply curve is vertical, and g < 0 if the supply curve is backward-bending. If we equate quantity supplied with quantity demanded to find the equilibrium price $P^{eqb}$, we find that

$$P^{eqb}=\frac{a-c}{g-b}.$$

This means that the equilibrium price depends positively on the demand intercept if g – b > 0, but depends negatively on it if g – b < 0. Which of these possibilities is relevant? In fact, starting from an initial static equilibrium and then changing a, the new equilibrium is relevant only if the market actually goes to that new equilibrium. Suppose that price adjustments in the market occur according to

$$\frac{dP}{dt}=\lambda (Q^{d}(P) - Q^{s}(P))$$

where $\lambda$ > 0 is the speed of adjustment parameter and $\frac{dP}{dt}$ is the time derivative of the price — that is, it denotes how fast and in what direction the price changes. By stability theory, P will converge to its equilibrium value if and only if the derivative $\frac{d(dP/dt)}{dP}$ is negative. This derivative is given by

$$\frac{d(dP/dt)}{dP} = - \lambda(-b+g).$$

This is negative if and only if g – b > 0, in which case the demand intercept parameter a positively influences the price. So we can say that while the direction of effect of the demand intercept on the equilibrium price is ambiguous when all we know is that the reciprocal of the supply curve's slope, g, is negative, in the only relevant case (in which the price actually goes to its new equilibrium value) an increase in the demand intercept increases the price. Note that this case, with g – b > 0, is the case in which the supply curve, if negatively sloped, is steeper than the demand curve.

== Without constraints ==
Suppose $p(x;q)$ is a smooth and strictly concave objective function where x is a vector of n endogenous variables and q is a vector of m exogenous parameters. Consider the unconstrained optimization problem $x^*(q)= \arg \max p(x;q)$. Let $f(x;q)=D_xp(x;q)$, the n by n matrix of first partial derivatives of $p(x;q)$ with respect to its first n arguments x_{1},...,x_{n}. The maximizer $x^*(q)$ is defined by the n×1 first order condition $f(x^*(q);q)=0$.

Comparative statics asks how this maximizer changes in response to changes in the m parameters. The aim is to find $\partial x^*_i/ \partial q_j, i=1,...,n, j=1,...,m$.

The strict concavity of the objective function implies that the Jacobian of f, which is exactly the matrix of second partial derivatives of p with respect to the endogenous variables, is nonsingular (has an inverse). By the implicit function theorem, then, $x^*(q)$ may be viewed locally as a continuously differentiable function, and the local response of $x^*(q)$ to small changes in q is given by

$$D_qx^*(q)=-[D_xf(x^*(q);q)]^{-1}D_qf(x^*(q);q).$$

Applying the chain rule and first order condition,

$$D_qp(x^*(q),q)=D_qp(x;q)|_{x=x^*(q)}.$$

(See Envelope theorem).

=== Application for profit maximization ===
Suppose a firm produces n goods in quantities $x_1,...,x_n$. The firm's profit is a function p of $x_1,...,x_n$ and of m exogenous parameters $q_1,...,q_m$ which may represent, for instance, various tax rates. Provided the profit function satisfies the smoothness and concavity requirements, the comparative statics method above describes the changes in the firm's profit due to small changes in the tax rates.

== With constraints ==
A generalization of the above method allows the optimization problem to include a set of constraints. This leads to the general envelope theorem. Applications include determining changes in Marshallian demand in response to changes in price or wage.

== Limitations and extensions ==
One limitation of comparative statics using the implicit function theorem is that results are valid only in a (potentially very small) neighborhood of the optimum—that is, only for very small changes in the exogenous variables. Another limitation is the potentially overly restrictive nature of the assumptions conventionally used to justify comparative statics procedures. For example, John Nachbar discovered in one of his case studies that using comparative statics in general equilibrium analysis works best with very small, individual level of data rather than at an aggregate level.

Paul Milgrom and Chris Shannon pointed out in 1994 that the assumptions conventionally used to justify the use of comparative statics on optimization problems are not actually necessary—specifically, the assumptions of convexity of preferred sets or constraint sets, smoothness of their boundaries, first and second derivative conditions, and linearity of budget sets or objective functions. In fact, sometimes a problem meeting these conditions can be monotonically transformed to give a problem with identical comparative statics but violating some or all of these conditions; hence these conditions are not necessary to justify the comparative statics. Stemming from the article by Milgrom and Shannon as well as the results obtained by Veinott and Topkis an important strand of operational research was developed called monotone comparative statics. In particular, this theory concentrates on the comparative statics analysis using only conditions that are independent of order-preserving transformations. The method uses lattice theory and introduces the notions of quasi-supermodularity and the single-crossing condition. The wide application of monotone comparative statics to economics includes production theory, consumer theory, game theory with complete and incomplete information, auction theory, and others.

== See also ==
- Model (economics)
- Qualitative economics
