= Iceberg transport cost model =

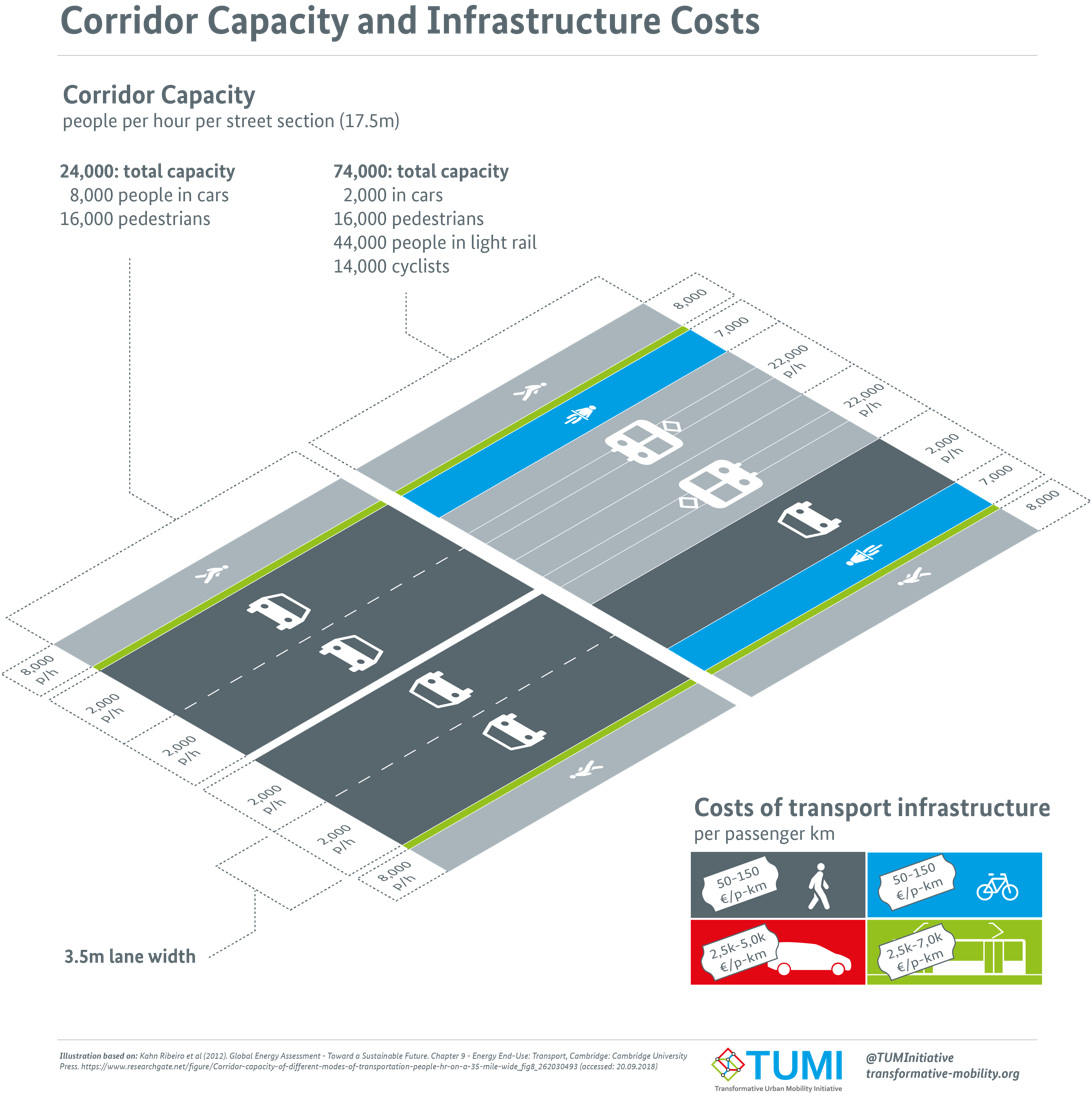
Illustration of motorists, pedestrians, light rail and cyclists with corridor capacity (people per hour per street section) and transport infrastructure costs per passenger kilometer

The iceberg transport cost model is a commonly used, simple economic model of transportation costs. It relates transport costs linearly with distance, and pays these costs by extracting from the arriving volume. The model is attributed to Paul Samuelson's 1954 article in Deardorffs' Glossary of International Economics. Paul Krugman's 1991 paper on Economic Geography is one of the more widely cited papers employing the model.

The metaphor is that an iceberg melts when transported, so only a fraction of the starting amount arrives at the destination. And a smaller amount arrives if the distance traveled is longer. A more realistic idea might be an oil tanker that uses up its oil based on the distance it travels.

== See also ==
- Gravity model of trade
