= Melbourne Principles =

The "Melbourne Principles" for Sustainable Cities are ten short statements on how cities can become more sustainable. They were developed in Melbourne (Australia) on 2 April 2002 during an international Charrette, sponsored by the United Nations Environment Programme (UNEP) and the International Council for Local Environmental Initiatives. Experts at the Charrette were drawn from developing and developed countries.

== Adoption ==
The Melbourne Principles were adopted at the Local Government Session of the Earth Summit 2002 in Johannesburg, as part of the final communique, known as Local Action 21 or the Johannesburg Call. They consist of ten short statements on how cities can become more sustainable. Each principle has a few paragraphs of elaboration that provides additional information on its meaning and application. The Principles are designed to be read by decision-makers, and provide a starting point on the journey towards sustainability. Additional tools will be needed to operationalize the Melbourne Principles.

== The 10 Melbourne Principles ==
1. Provide a long-term vision for cities based on: sustainability; intergenerational, social, economic and political equity; and their individuality.

A long-term vision is the starting point for catalysing positive change, leading to sustainability. The vision needs to reflect the distinctive nature and characteristics of each city. The vision should also express the shared aspirations of the people for their cities to become more sustainable. It needs to address equity, which means equal access to both natural and human resources, as well as shared responsibility for preserving the value of these resources for future generations. A vision based on sustainability will help align and motivate communities, governments, businesses and others around a common purpose, and will provide a basis for developing a strategy, an action programme and processes to achieve that vision.

2. Achieve long-term economic and social security.

Long-term economic and social security are prerequisites for beneficial change and are dependent upon environmentally sound, sustainable development. To achieve triple bottom line sustainability, economic strategies need to increase the value and vitality of human and natural systems, and conserve and renew human, financial and natural resources. Through fair allocation of resources, economic strategies should seek to meet basic human needs in a just and equitable manner. In particular, economic strategies should guarantee the right to potable water, clean air, food security, shelter and safe sanitation. Cities are the locus of human diversity; their policies, structures and institutions can significantly contribute to fostering cohesive, stimulating, safe and fulfilled communities.

3. Recognise the intrinsic value of biodiversity and natural ecosystems, and protect and restore them.

Nature is more than a commodity for the benefit of humans. We share the Earth with many other life-forms that have their own intrinsic value. They warrant our respect, whether or not they are of immediate benefit to us. It is through people's direct experience with nature that they understand its value and gain a better appreciation of the importance of healthy habitats and ecosystems. This connection provides them with an appreciation of the need to manage our interactions with nature empathetically. Just as humans have the ability to alter the habitat and even to extinguish other species, we can also protect and restore biodiversity. Therefore, we have a responsibility to act as custodians for nature.

4. Enable communities to minimise their ecological footprint.

Cities consume significant quantities of resources and have a major impact on the environment, well beyond what they can handle within their borders. These unsustainable trends need to be substantially curbed and eventually reversed. One way of describing the impact of a city is to measure its ecological footprint. The ecological footprint of a city is a measure of the 'load' on nature imposed by meeting the needs of its population. It represents the land area necessary to sustain current levels of resource consumption and waste discharged by that population. Reducing the ecological footprint of a city is a positive contribution towards sustainability. Like any living system, a community consumes material, water and energy inputs, processes them into usable forms and generates wastes. This is the 'metabolism' of the city and making this metabolism more efficient is essential to reducing the city's ecological footprint. In reducing the footprint, problems should be solved locally where possible, rather than shifting them to other geographic locations or future generations.

5. Build on the characteristics of ecosystems in the development and nurturing of healthy and sustainable cities.

Cities can become more sustainable by modelling urban processes on ecological principles of form and function, by which natural ecosystems operate. The characteristics of ecosystems include diversity, adaptiveness, interconnectedness, resilience, regenerative capacity and symbiosis. These characteristics can be incorporated by cities in the development of strategies to make them more productive and regenerative, resulting in ecological, social and economic benefits.

6. Recognise and build on the distinctive characteristics of cities, including their human and cultural values, history and natural systems.

Each city has a distinctive profile of human, cultural, historic and natural characteristics. This profile provides insights on pathways to sustainability that are both acceptable to their people and compatible with their values, traditions, institutions and ecological realities. Building on existing characteristics helps motivate and mobilise the human and physical resources of cities to achieve sustainable development and regeneration.

7. Empower people and foster participation.

The journey towards sustainability requires broadly based support. Empowering people mobilises local knowledge and resources and enlists the support and active participation of all who need to be involved in all stages, from long-term planning to implementation of sustainable solutions. People have a right to be involved in the decisions that affect them. Attention needs to be given to empowering those whose voices are not always heard, such as the poor.

8. Expand and enable cooperative networks to work towards a common, sustainable future.

Strengthening existing networks and establishing new cooperative networks within cities facilitate the transfer of knowledge and support continual environmental improvement. The people of cities are the key drivers for transforming cities towards sustainability. This can be achieved effectively if the people living in cities are well informed, can easily access knowledge and share learning. Furthermore, the energy and talent of people can be enhanced by people working with one another through such networks. There is also value in cities sharing their learning with other cities, pooling resources to develop sustainability tools, and supporting and mentoring one another through inter-city and regional networks. These networks can serve as vehicles for information exchange and encouraging collective effort.

9. Promote sustainable production and consumption, through appropriate use of environmentally sound technologies and effective demand management.

A range of approaches and tools can be used to promote sustainable practices. Demand management, which includes accurate valuations of natural resources and increasing public awareness, is a valuable strategy to support sustainable consumption. This approach can also provide significant savings in infrastructure investment. Sustainable production can be supported by the adoption and use of environmentally sound technologies which can improve environmental performance significantly. These technologies protect the environment, are less polluting, use resources in a sustainable manner, recycle more of their wastes and products and handle all residual wastes in a more environmentally acceptable way than the technologies for which they are substitutes. Environmentally sound technologies can also be used to drive reduced impacts and enhance value along a supply chain and support businesses embracing product stewardship.

10. Enable continual improvement, based on accountability, transparency and good governance. Good urban governance requires robust processes directed towards achieving the transformation of cities to sustainability through continual improvement. While in some areas gains will be incremental, there are also opportunities to make substantial improvements through innovative strategies, programmes and technologies.

To manage the continual improvement cycle, it is necessary to use relevant indicators, set targets based on benchmarks and monitor progress against milestones to achieving these targets. This facilitates progress and accountability and ensures effective implementation. Transparency and openness to scrutiny are part of good governance.

The vision promoted by the Melbourne Principles is to create environmentally healthy, vibrant and sustainable cities where people respect one another and nature, to the benefit of all. The principles provide a key to unlocking a sound approach to transforming cities towards sustainability. They provide:

- A holistic approach to making cities sustainable.
- A framework around which consensus and commitment can be built and strategy developed.
- A framework in which cities can build their programs and engage their communities.
- A framework in which international, regional and country programs can coalesce and strengthen linkages and cooperation.

== Application ==
Two ICLEI organisations went on to publish a further document, "Operationalising the Melbourne Principles for Sustainable Cities", which seeks to examine case studies of cities striving for sustainability, and to learn lessons from these. The case studies include the Greater Vancouver Regional District, Waitakere City, New Zealand, Santa Monica, California. The document includes a checklist "to assess the extent to which the plan / document accounts for the elements of sustainability embodied in the Melbourne Principles."

A 2007 expert paper prepared for discussion by UNEP and UNDESA, suggests some possible strategies for cities aiming to follow the Melbourne Principles:

- Create urban environments threaded with natural habitat corridors
- Focus urban transport planning on public mass transit systems integrated with pedestrian only streets
- Ensure adequate financing for the above activities, support for needed capacity building and institutional strengthening, and technology transfer, knowledge and know-how. For example:
  - provide capacity building for city planning agencies to assist them in reclaiming urban spaces for parks
  - support knowledge sharing on the design, implementation and management of sustainable urban transport systems.

Some cities are already adopting the Melbourne Principles explicitly. For example, Penrith, New South Wales adopted the principles in 2003, and has used them to measure the city's progress towards sustainability.
