= The Theory of Wages =

British microeconomics treatise of the early 20th century

The Theory of Wages is a book by the British economist John Hicks, published in 1932 (2nd ed., 1963). It has been described as a classic microeconomic statement of wage determination in competitive markets. It anticipates a number of developments in distribution and growth theory and remains a standard work in labour economics.

Part I of the book takes as its starting point a reformulation of the marginal productivity theory of wages as determined by supply and demand in full competitive equilibrium of a free market economy. Part II considers regulated labour markets resulting from labour disputes, trade unions and government action. The 2nd edition (1963) includes a harsh critical review and, from Hicks, two subsequent related articles and an extensive commentary.

The book presents:

- labour demand as derived from the demand for output, such that for example a fall in the wage rate would lead to substitution away from other inputs and more labour use from increased production that the lower wage would facilitate
- the first statement of the economic concept of elasticity of substitution, a measure of the substitution effect posited above as to how much one factor of production (say labour) would change to keep output constant in response to a change in relative factor prices
- the relation of this concept and its determinants to the distribution of factor-income shares
- technical change as biased or neutral (later termed Hicks-neutral technical change), depending on how it affects the marginal product of one productive factor (say labour) relative to that of another (say capital)
- a macroeconomic hypothesis about induced innovation that "[a] change in the relative prices of the factors of production is itself a spur to invention, and to invention of a particular kind—directed to economising the use of a factor which has become relatively expensive," including from one factor (say capital) growing at a faster rate than another (say labour) (p. 124)
- elements of employee-employer attachments in distinguishing regular and casual labour with an emphasis on expectations, imperfect information and uncertainty in the labour market
- the first-ever attempt to model a labour dispute that might end in a strike.

== Topical outline ==
The body of the second edition is 384 pages, following a 9-page analytical table of contents. It is organized as follows.

Section I. The Text of the First Edition (248 pages)
Part I — The Free Market

Chapter

- I. Marginal Productivity and the Demand for Labour
- II. Continuity and Individual Differences [analysing current objections to marginal productivity]
- III. Unemployment [examining different effects from "normal unemployment," casual unemployment, seasonal unemployment and other foreseeable factors, such as wage rigidity]
- IV. The Working of Competition [including the theory of "bargaining advantage," local and occupational differences in wages, labour mobility, and exploitation of labour]
- V. Individual Supply of Labour [including variations in wages from efficiency of labour and effect of wage rates on labour supply]
- VI. Distribution and Economic Progress [on absolute and relative shares of labour in social income as influenced by elasticity of substitution, an increase in the supply of one factor of production, and invention].

Part II — The Regulation of Wages

- VII. The Theory of Industrial Disputes [including origins of labour combinations, the idea of a fair wage, diagrammatic treatment of strike duration, and conditions favouring labour union success]
- VIII. The Growth of Trade Union Power
- IX. Wage-Regulation and Unemployment
- X. Further Consequences of Wage-Regulation
- XI. Hours and Conditions

Appendix [with discussion and mathematical proofs on statements in Chapter IV about absolute and relative shares of income (the "Social Dividend") relative to its elasticity of derived demand, with or without increasing returns]

Section II. Documents (57 pages)

- G.F. Shove, 1933. "The Theory of Wages. By J.R. Hicks," Economic Journal, 43(171), p p. 460-72.
- J.R. Hicks, 1935. "Wages and Interest: The Dynamic Problem," Economic Journal, 45(179), p p.456-468.
- _____, 1936. "Distribution and Economic Progress: A Revised Version," Review of Economic Studies, 4(1), p p. 1-12.

Section III. Commentary (80 pages) [on respective earlier chapters and Section II documents, concluding with mathematical "Notes" on the elasticity of substitution as to its definition, generalization to multiple factors and products, and application to Marshall rules of derived demand]

== See also ==
- Distribution (economics)#Neoclassical distribution theory
- Hicks-Marshall laws of derived demand
- Technological change#Economics
- Labour economics#Neoclassical microeconomics of labour markets
- Value and Capital (complementary 1939 book by Hicks)
