= Hicks–Marshall laws of derived demand =

Concept in economics

In economics, the Hicks–Marshall laws of derived demand assert that, other things equal, the own-wage elasticity of demand for a category of labor is high under the following conditions:

- When the price elasticity of demand for the product being produced is high (scale effect), an increase in wages will lead to a large change in the quantity of the final product demanded affecting employment greatly.
- When other factors of production can be easily substituted for the category of labor (substitution effect).
- When the supply of other factors of production is highly elastic (that is, usage of other factors of production can be increased without substantially increasing their prices) (substitution effect). That is, employers can easily replace labor as doing so will only moderately increase other factor prices.
- When the cost of employing the category of labor is a large share of the total costs of production (scale effect)

The "Hicks–Marshall" is named for economists John Hicks (from The Theory of Wages, 1932) and Alfred Marshall (from Principles of Economics, 1890).

== See also ==
- Hicksian demand function
- Marshallian demand function
