= Generalized Ozaki cost function =

In economics the generalized-Ozaki (GO) cost function is a general description of the cost of production proposed by Shinichiro Nakamura. The GO cost function is notable for explicitly considering nonhomothetic technology, where the proportions of inputs can vary as the output changes. This stands in contrast to the standard production model, which assumes homothetic technology.

== The GO function ==
For a given output $y$, at time $t$ and a vector of $m$ input prices $p_i$, the generalized-Ozaki (GO) cost function $C()$ is expressed as

$C(p,y,t) = \sum_i b_{ii} \left( y^{b_{yi}}e^{b_{ti}t} p_i + \sum_{j\,:\,j\neq i} b_{ij} \sqrt{p_ip_j} y^{b_y} e^{b_tt}\right)$	1

Here, $b_{ij}=b_{ji}$ and $\sum_i b_{ij}=1$, $i,j=1,..,m$. By applying the Shephard's lemma, we derive the demand function for input $i$, $x_i$ :

$x_i={\partial c\over\partial p_i}= b_{ii}y^{b_{yi}}\exp^{b_{it}t} + \textstyle \sum_{i\neq j}^m b_{ij}\sqrt{p_i/p_j}y^{b_y}\exp^{b_t t}$

2

The GO cost function is flexible in the price space, and treats scale effects and technical change in a highly general manner. The concavity condition which ensures that a constant function aligns with cost minimization for a specific set of $p$, necessitates that its Hessian (the matrix of second partial derivatives with respect to $p_i$ and $p_j$) being negative semidefinite.

Several notable special cases can be identified:

- Homothticity (HT): $b_{yi}=b_y$ for all $i$. All input levels ($x_i$) scale proportionally with the overall output level ($y$).
- Homogeneity of (of degree one) in output (HG): $b_y = 0$ in addition to HT.
- Factor limitationality (FL): $b_{yi}=0$ for all $i$. None of the input levels ($x_i$) depend on $p$.
- Neutral technical change (NT): $b_{ti}=b_t$ for all $i$.

When (HT) holds, the GO function reduces to the Generalized Leontief function of Diewert, A well-known flexible functional form for cost and production functions. When (FL) hods, it reduces to a non-linear version of Leontief's model, which explains the cross-sectional variation of $x_i$ when variations in input prices were negligible: (Note: Up until 1990, the predominant user of this functional form was Iwao Ozaki, a Japanese economist, which explains its namesake. Although much of Ozaki's work remains in Japanese and isn't readily accessible to the general public, there is an exception found in the paper "Economies of Scale and Input-Output Coefficients" within the book "Applications of Input-Output Analysis," edited by A. Carter and A. Brody. This publication is available from North-Holland Publishers, dated 1969, spanning pages 280-302.")

$x_i = b_{ii}y^{b_{yi}}$

3

== Background ==
=== Cost- and production functions ===
In economics, production technology is typically represented by the production function $f$, which, in the case of a single output $y$ and $m$ inputs, is written as $y=f(x)$. When considering cost minimization for a given set of prices $p$ and $y$, the corresponding cost function $C(p,y)$ can be expressed as:

$C(p,y)= \min_x(p^\top x|f(x)\geq y)$

4

The duality theorems of cost and production functions state that once a well-behaved cost function is established, one can derive the corresponding production function, and vice versa. For a given cost function $C(p,y)$, the corresponding production function $f$ can be obtained as (a more rigorous derivation involves using a distance function instead of a production function) :

$f(x) = \max (y|C(p,y)\leq p^\top x, \text{ for all possible }p)$

5

In essence, under general conditions, a specific technology can be equally effectively represented by both cost and production functions. One advantage of using a cost function rather than a production function is that the demand functions for inputs can be easily derived from the former using Shephard's lemma, whereas this process can become cumbersome with the production function.

=== Homothetic- and Nonhomothetic Technology ===
Commonly used forms of production functions, such as Cobb-Douglas and Constant Elasticity of Substitution (CES) functions exhibit homothticity. This property means that the production function $f$ can be represented as a positive monotone transformation of a linear-homogeneous function $h$:

$y = f(x) = \phi(h(x))$

where $h(\lambda x) = \lambda h(x)$ for any $\lambda > 0$. The Cobb-Douglas function is a special case of the CES function for which the elasticity of substitution between the inputs, $\sigma$, is one.

For a homothetic technology, the cost function can be represented as

$C(p,y) = c(p)d(y)$

where $d$ is a monotone increasing function, and $c$ is termed a unit cost function. From Shephard's lemma, we obtain the following expression for the ratio of inputs $i$ and $j$:

$\frac{x_i}{x_j}=\frac{\partial c(p)/\partial p_i}{\partial c(p)/\partial p_j}$,

which implies that for a homothetic technology, the ratio of inputs depends solely on prices and not on the scale of output. However, empirical studies on the cross-section of establishments show that the FL model (3) effectively explains the data, particularly for heavy industries such as steel mills, paper mills, basic chemical sectors, and power stations, indicating that homotheticity may not be applicable.

Furthermore, in the areas of trade, homothetic and monolithic functional models do not accurately predict results. One example is in the gravity equation for trade, or how much will two countries trade with each other based on GDP and distance. This led researchers to explore non-homothetic models of production, to fit with a cross section analysis of producer behavior, for example, when producers would begin to minimize costs by switching inputs or investing in increased production.

=== Flexible Functional Forms ===
CES functions (note that Cobb-Douglas is a special case of CES) typically involve only two inputs, such as capital and labor. While they can be extended to include more than two inputs, assuming the same degree of substitutability for all inputs may seem overly restrictive (refer to CES for further details on this topic, including the potential for accommodating diverse elasticities of substitution among inputs, although this capability is somewhat constrained). To address this limitation, flexible functional forms have been developed. These general functional forms are called flexible functional forms (FFFs) because they do not impose any restrictions a priori on the degree of substitutability among inputs. These FFFs can provide a second-order approximation to any twice-differentiable function that meets the necessary regulatory conditions, including basic technological conditions and those consistent with cost minimization. Widely used examples of FFFs are the transcendental logarithmic (translog) function and the Generalized Leontief (GL) function. The translog function extends the Cobb-Douglas function to the second order, while the GL function performs a similar extension to the Leontief production function.

=== Limitations ===
A drawback of the GL function is its inability to be globally concave without sacrificing flexibility in the price space. This limitation also applies to the GO function, as it is a non-homothetic extension of the GL. In a subsequent study, Nakamura attempted to address this issue by employing the Generalized McFadden function. For further advancements in this area, refer to Ryan and Wales.

Moreover, both the GO function and the underlying GL function presume immediate adjustments of inputs in response to changes in $p$ and $y$. This oversimplifies the reality where technological changes entail significant investments in plant and equipment, thus requiring time, often occurring over years rather than instantaneously. One way to address this issue will be to resort to a variable cost function that explicitly takes into account differences in the speed of adjustments among inputs.

== See also ==
Production function

List of production functions

Constant elasticity of substitution

Shephard's lemma

Returns to scale
