= List of production functions =

This is a list of production functions that have been used in the economics literature. Production functions are a key part of modelling national output and national income. For a much more extensive discussion of various types of production functions and their properties, their relationships and origin, see Chambers (1988) and Sickles and Zelenyuk (2019, Chapter 6).

The production functions listed below, and their properties are shown for the case of two factors of production, capital (K), and labor (L), mostly for heuristic purposes. These functions and their properties are easily generalizable to include additional factors of production (like land, natural resources, entrepreneurship, etc.)

== Technology ==
There are three common ways to incorporate technology (or the efficiency with which factors of production are used) into a production function (here A is a scale factor, F is a production function, and Y is the amount of physical output produced):

- Hicks-neutral technology, or "non-factor augmenting": $\ Y = AF(K,L)$
- Harrod-neutral technology, or "labor augmenting": $\ Y = F(K,AL)$
- Solow-neutral technology, or "capital augmenting": $\ Y = F(AK,L)$

== Elasticity of substitution ==
The elasticity of substitution between factors of production is a measure of how easily one factor can be substituted for another. With two factors of production, say, K and L, it is a measure of the curvature of a production isoquant. The mathematical definition is:

$$\ \epsilon=\left[\frac {\partial(slope)} {\partial(L/K)} \frac {L/K} {slope}\right]^{-1}$$

where "slope" denotes the slope of the isoquant, given by

$$\ slope=-\frac {\partial F(K,L)/ \partial K} {\partial F(K,L)/ \partial L}.$$

== Returns to scale ==
Returns to scale can be

- Increasing returns to scale: doubling all input usages more than doubles output.
- Decreasing returns to scale: doubling all input usages less than doubles output.
- Constant returns to scale: doubling all input usages exactly doubles output.

== Some widely used forms ==
- Constant elasticity of substitution (CES) function:

$Y = A[\alpha K^\gamma + (1-\alpha) L^\gamma]^{\frac{1}{\gamma}}$, with $\gamma \isin [-\infty,1]$

which includes the special cases of:

- Linear production (or perfect substitutes)

$\ Y=A[\alpha K+ (1-\alpha) L]$ when $\ \gamma=1$

- Cobb–Douglas production function (or imperfect complements)

$\ Y=AK^\alpha L^{1-\alpha}$ when $\gamma \to 0$

- Leontief production function (or perfect complements)

$\ Y=\text{Min}[K,L]$ when $\gamma \to -\infty$

- Translog, a linear approximation of CES via a Taylor polynomial about $\gamma = 0$

$$\ln(Y)=\ln(A)+a_L \ln(L)+a_K \ln(K)+b_{LL}\ln^2(L) + b_{LK} \ln(L) \ln(K) + b_{KK} \ln^2(K)$$

- Stone-Geary, a variation of the Cobb-Douglas production function that considers existence of a threshold factor requirement (represented by $z$) of each output

$$Y=A\prod_{i=1}^n(x_i-z_i)^{\alpha_{i}}$$

== Some Exotic Production Functions ==
- Variable Elasticity of Substitution Production Function (VES)

$$Y=AK^{a v}[L+baK]^{(1-a)v}$$

- Transcendental Production Function

$$Y=Ae^{a_1 K+a_2 L}K^{1-b}L^{b}$$

- Constant Marginal Value Share (CMS)

$$Y=AK^{\alpha}L^{1-\alpha}-mL$$

- Spillman Production Function (This function is referenced in Agricultural Economics Research)

$$y=m- A \prod_{i=1}^n a_i^{x_i}$$

- von Liebig Production Function

$$Y=\min\{Y^*, \beta_1+\beta_2 L,\beta_2+\beta_4 K\}$$
where $Y^*$ is the maximal yield (considers capacity limits).

- The Generalized Ozaki (GO) Cost Function (because of the duality between cost and production functions, a specific technology can be represented equally well by either the cost or production function).

$$C(p,y) = \sum_i b_{ii} \left( y^{b_{yi}} p_i + \sum_{j\,:\,j\neq i} b_{ij} \sqrt{p_ip_j} y^{b_y} \right)$$.
where $c$ denotes the cost per unit output, the unit cost, $b_{ij}=b_{ji}$, and $\sum_i b_{ij} = 1$. This cost function reduces to the well-known Generalized Leontief function of Diewert when $b_{yi}=0$ for all inputs.
By applying the Shephard's lemma, we derive the demand function for input $i$, $x_i$:
$$x_i = {\partial C\over\partial p_i}= b_{ii}y^{b_{yi}} +
\textstyle \sum_{i\neq j}^m b_{ij}\sqrt{p_i/p_j}y^{b_y}$$

Here, $a_i$ denotes the amount of input $i$ per unit of output.
