= Robert G. McCloskey =

American historian

- Born: January 8, 1916; Wisconsin Rapids, Wisconsin, U.S.
- Died: August 4, 1969 (aged 53); Peter Bent Brigham Hospital, Boston, Massachusetts, U.S
- Spouse: Helen Stueland
- Children: 3, including Deirdre

Academic background
- Education: University of Wisconsin (BA); Harvard University (PhD)

Robert Green McCloskey (8 January 1916 – 4 August 1969) was an American political historian.

== Biography ==
Robert McCloskey originally studied at the University of Wisconsin, receiving an AB, eventually completing his doctorate in political science at Harvard University, whose faculty he joined in 1948. He was secretary of the Littauer Center of Public Administration until 1954, when Arthur Maass took the position. He became an associate professor at the university in 1953, eventually settling as Professor of Government in 1958.

McCloskey was awarded a Guggenheim Fellowship in 1959. His book The American Supreme Court was the winner of the 1961 Award of the Contemporary Affairs Society. In 1966, McCloskey was named Jonathan Trumbull Professor of American History and Government at Harvard. The position had been vacant since 1963, upon the death of V. O. Key. McCloskey died on 4 August 1969.

McCloskey's book American Conservatism in the Age of Enterprise was first published in 1951. The book was based on his doctoral dissertation, and explored conservatism in the United States from the Reconstruction era to 1910, by considering the publications of William Graham Sumner, Stephen Johnson Field, and Andrew Carnegie. The first edition of The American Supreme Court was published in 1961 as part of a series, and described as "lucidly written, well-reasoned, and concise" by Robert J. Harris, and "one of the best of a rare breed" by Paul W. Fox. In 2011, Keith E. Whittington called it "the classic one-volume history of the Court."

Robert McCloskey married Helen Stueland, with whom he had 3 children (including economist Deirdre McCloskey) before dying at the Peter Bent Bridhamn Hospital (now part of the Brigham and Women's Hospital) in August 1969. Following his death, a student of McCloskey's, Sanford Levinson, continued updating The American Supreme Court. A third book by McCloskey, titled The Modern Supreme Court, was posthumously published in 1974.
