= Bourgeois Dignity =

2010 book by Deirdre McCloskey

- Author: Deirdre McCloskey
- Subjects: Capitalism, economic history
- Publication date: November 15, 2011
- ISBN: 978-0226556741

Bourgeois Dignity: Why Economics Can’t Explain the Modern World is a 2010 book by economist and social theorist Deirdre McCloskey that is the second of a three-book series laying out the thesis that a change in the rhetoric surrounding the value of business, innovation, and entrepreneurship was the main factor responsible for the takeoff of economic growth in Northwest Europe in the late 18th century. Bourgeois Dignity focuses on arguing that there was a fairly significant and unprecedented takeoff of economic growth, and that existing explanations for this takeoff are inadequate. McCloskey provides a rough outline for why she thinks that the changes in rhetoric surrounding the dignity of business and markets were crucial, but leaves the elaborate case for later books in the series.

== Reception ==
=== Promotion ===
Around the time of the book release, National Review published an interview of McCloskey. McCloskey has also given lengthy talks on the themes of the book, some of which can be found online.

A June 2013 event at the Cato Institute featuring McCloskey, and titled How Markets and Innovation Became Ethical and Then Suspect, was about McCloskey's next planned book in the series. Other participants were Donald Boudreaux and Dalibor Rohac.

=== Book reviews ===
Donald Boudreaux, economics professor at George Mason University and blogger at Cafe Hayek, reviewed the book very favorably for The Independent Review, the peer-reviewed journal of the Independent Institute. Boudreaux's chief criticism was that the subtitle's criticism of economics might be referring to too narrow a conception of economics and that the broader tradition of economics (that would include McCloskey's own work) would be exempt from this criticism.

Henry Clark of Clemson University reviewed the book for the Erasmus Journal for Philosophy and Economics. Clark's review emphasized that McCloskey's case was not yet complete and that McCloskey would need to successfully address a number of issues (that he listed) in order to convince people of her thesis. Clark also noted the similarity between McCloskey's book and Steven Pinker's book The Better Angels of Our Nature on the decline of violence.

Diane Coyle wrote a mixed but generally favorable review of the book for the New Statesman.

Rich Lowry reviewed the book for National Review, Andrew Morriss reviewed the book for Books and Culture, and Jack High reviewed the book for the Review of Austrian Economics.
