= H. Scott Gordon =

Canadian economist (1924–2019)

Howard Scott Gordon
- Born: 1924; Halifax, Nova Scotia
- Died: 2019 (aged 94–95)
- Occupations: Economist, historian, and philosopher

Howard Scott Gordon (1924–2019) was a Canadian economist, historian, and philosopher of social science. His seminal 1954 article The Economic Theory of a Common Property Resource: The Fishery marked the beginning of the modern economics study of common pool resources, including fisheries. His 1954 article, published in The Journal of Political Economy, has been cited more than 7,700 times as of January 2026, and deeply inspired three of his younger colleagues at Indiana University--Elinor Ostrom, Roy Gardner, and James Walker--to study the economics of the commons. He spent most of his career at Indiana University in Bloomington, teaching and writing about the history and philosophy of economics.

== Life and career ==
H. Scott Gordon was born in Halifax, Nova Scotia. His father was a blacksmith. According to a colleague at Indiana University, Professor George W. Wilson, Gordon hated the name Howard, and eventually would drop the "H" from his name in formal publications. He earned his undergraduate degree in economics from Dalhousie University in 1944, and a few years later he earned a Masters degree in economics at Columbia University (MA, 1947). Similar to Ronald Coase, Gordon earned renown in economic theory, policy, and philosophy without the benefit of a PhD, which he eventually completed at McGill University in 1964.

He was a lecturer in economics at McGill University in 1947-1948. He then joined the recently established Carleton College (now Carleton University) in Ottawa. At age 24, holding a Masters degree only, Gordon became the founding Chair of the Economics Department at Carleton University and chaired the department from 1948 to 1966. He left Carleton in 1966 to become a professor in the Department of Economics at Indiana University. He chaired the Economics Department at IU from 1970 to 1973. From 1983 he had a split appointment with Economics and the highly distinguished IU Department of History and Philosophy of Science. He retired in 1989, having reached the age of 65, which was the maximum age permitted by Indiana University faculty at that time. He would go on to publish his two most significant books during his retirement years.

For many years, Gordon also taught summer courses in the history of economic theory at Queen's University from 1970 until 1996.

He held, in addition, several visiting positions including at Cambridge University (1954-1955), The University of Chicago (1956-1957), and Purdue University (1967-1968).

== Fishing quotas ==
Gordon's seminal and most well-known research on common pool resources and the tragedy of the commons is found in a 1954 Journal of Political Economy paper (pp. 132-135), The Economic Theory of a Common Property Resource: The Fishery. Unfortunately, the American ecologist Garrett Hardin did not cite Gordon's discovery and prior economic analysis in the 1968 Science article which made Hardin--and the tragedy of the commons--world famous. Amongst other things, Gordon demonstrated in 1954 an efficiency-enhancing role for individual fishing quotas (IFQs), also known as "individual transferable quotas" (ITQs).

== Honors and legacy ==
In 1991 Scott Gordon was named Distinguished Research Professor of Indiana University, where he had been Professor of Economics and, later, Professor of History and Philosophy of Science, since 1966. He gave on that occasion a public lecture, "How Many Kinds of Things Are There in the World?" Gordon's students included George W. Wilson, Margaret Schabas, J. Alfred Broaddus, D. Wade Hands and, during his undergraduate studies, Stephen Ziliak, who has cited Gordon in many publications since 1996 on topics ranging from the history of poor relief to the role of statistics in scientific method. In Welfare, Property Rights and Economic Policy - Essays and Tributes in Honour of H. Scott Gordon by T.K. Rymes the author celebrates Gordon as one of "Canada's most distinguished social scientist and economics scholars." Rymes' book was cited in the International Journal of Transport Economics (1993). Gordon was a Guggenheim Fellow for the academic year 1964–1965. For the period of 1977-1978, Gordon served as president of the Canadian Economics Association. His papers are housed in an archival repository at Indiana University.

John B. Davis of Marquette University reviewed Gordon's magnum opus, The History and Philosophy of Social Science (1991), in the Southern Economic Journal. In June 2019, Davis posted a note in memoriam at the Societies for the History of Economics (SHOE), stating: "He [Scott Gordon] was of a generation of scholars now largely gone who wrote comprehensive, synthetic accounts of the history and philosophy of economics. The book, or sections of it, can still be used in teaching in the field today and is particularly useful because it places economics’ history fully within the development of social science."

Many of Gordon's contributions were published in The Journal of Political Economy in an era when few economists cared to consider the history and philosophy of their field. When Gordon retired in 1989 a colleague and former student from Carleton, Professor George W. Wilson, recalled a telling episode about Gordon's unusually brave career path in an article published in The Trend Line, the Alumni magazine for the Indiana University Department of Economics:

"A visit to Cambridge University, England, in 1954-55 on a Social Science Research Council of Canada fellowship resulted in what is "The London Economist and the High Tide of Laissez-Faire," the article in the 1955 JEP.

His 1968 article, "The Close of the Galbraithian System," is sometimes erroneously credited to Robert Solow, perhaps because Gordon's critique of popular books by John Kenneth Galbraith and his simultaneous defense of neoclassical economic theory was both passionate and extremely well written.

== Articles ==
- Gordon, H. Scott (1950). "The Pragmatic Basis of Economic Theory," The Canadian Journal of Economics and Political Science 16 (4): 475-500.
- Gordon, H. Scott (1951). "The Trawler Question in the United Kingdom and Canada," Dalhousie Review (Summer).
- Gordon, H. Scott (1952). "On a Misinterpretation of the Law of Diminishing Returns in Alfred Marshall's Principles," Canadian Journal of Economics and Political Science (Feb. issue).
- Gordon, H. Scott (1954). "The Economic Theory of a Common-Property Resource: The Fishery". Journal of Political Economy. 62 (2): 124–142. doi:10.1086/257497. S2CID 15945948.
- Gordon, H. Scott (1955). "The London Economist and the High Tide of Laissez Faire," Journal of Political Economy 63 (6): 461-488.
- Gordon, H. Scott (1963). "Ideas of Economic Justice," Daedalus 92(3): 433-446.
- Gordon, H. Scott (1965). "Why Does Marxian Exploitation Theory Require a Labor Theory of Value?" Journal of Political Economy76(1):137-140.
- Gordon, Scott (1968). "The Close of the Galbraithian System," Journal of Political Economy 76(4): 635-644.
- Gordon, Scott (1969). "Social Science and Modern Man," in Visions of Canada: The Alan B. Plaunt Memorial Lectures, 1958-1992 (McGill-Queen's University Press): 216-248.
- Gordon, Scott (1975). "The Political Economy of Big Questions and Small Ones," Canadian Public Policy 1(1): 97-106.
- Gordon, Scott (1976). "The New Contractarians," Journal of Political Economy 84(3): 573-590.
- Gordon, Scott (1977). "Social Science and Value Judgements," The Canadian Journal of Economics 10(4): 529-546.
- Gordon, Scott (1978). "Should Economists Pay Attention to Philosophers?" Journal of Political Economy 86(4): 717-728.
- Gordon, Scott (1980). "The Economics of the Afterlife," Journal of Political Economy 88(1): 213-214.
- Gordon, Scott (1982). "Why Did Marshall Transpose the Axes?" Eastern Economic Journal 8(1): 31-45.

== Books ==
- Gordon, H. Scott (1961). The Economists Versus the Bank of Canada (Why 29 Economics Professors Signed a Letter Calling for a Drastic Reorganization of the Bank of Canada) (Ryerson Press).
- Gordon, Scott (1980). Welfare, Justice, and Freedom. Columbia University Press. ISBN 0231049765.
- Gordon, Scott (1991). The History and Philosophy of Social Science. Routledge.
- Gordon, Scott (1999). Controlling the State: Constitutionalism from Ancient Athens to Today. Cambridge, Massachusetts: Harvard University Press. ISBN 9780674009776.
