= Induced innovation =

Induced innovation is a microeconomic hypothesis first proposed in 1932 by John Hicks in his work The Theory of Wages. He proposed that "a change in the relative prices of the factors of production is itself a spur to invention, and to invention of a particular kind—directed to economizing the use of a factor which has become relatively expensive."

Considerable literature has been produced on this hypothesis, which is often presented in terms of the effects of wage increases as an encouragement to labor-saving innovation. The hypothesis has also been applied to viewing increases in energy costs as a motivation for a more rapid improvement in energy efficiency of goods than would normally occur.

== Induced innovation in climate change ==
A significant application of Hicks's theory can be found in the field of climate change. The exponential population growth occurred in the last century has drastically increased pressure on natural resources. In order to have a sustainable future it is imperative to modify global strategies on climate change and the induced innovation theory can aid to model these policies.

To calculate the human impact on the environment economists often use the I=P*A*T equation where “I”, the impact variable, (for example energy consumption) is the product of “P”, the population, “A” the affluence (often embodied by GDP per capita) and “T” the technology.

The technical coefficient represents the efficiency of the system in use for particular resource and expresses the average state of technology. The decrease of "T" would indicate a gain in efficiency however “I” could still be growing or remaining stable if the improved technology is not sufficient to compensate the effect of an increase in "P" and "A". Therefore, a reduction in “I” would always mean that pressure on resources has lightened but this might not always be the consequence of using resources more efficiently (reducing T).

A fundamental issue of climate change is the excess of greenhouse gasses in the atmosphere particularly CO_{2} as the result of an intensified economic activity. Global GDP and CO_{2} emissions were growing at a corresponding rate in the until the 1970s. It was then that oil prices have increased greatly causing people to reduce its consumption.

According to Hicks's theory a change in factor prices will stimulate development of technical innovation to reduce the use of the factor for which the price increased compared to other factors. Following the oil shock significant investments were made in alternative sources of energy, more efficient cars and heating systems to mitigate oil consumption. As a result, CO_{2} emissions started growing at a slower rate than GDP per capita. Although petrol prices then dropped in the 1980s, CO_{2} emissions have continued to grow more slowly than GDP. This is an indication of a complete structural change in technology induced by the need to innovate.

== Induced innovation in agriculture ==
The development of agriculture is a fundamental part of the world economic growth. Being able to meet the demand of an exponentially growing population can be a challenging task, especially if we consider that one of the most important factors, land, remains fairly fixed.

According to the World Bank data, less than 38% of the global surface area can be deemed usable for cultivation of crops or permanent pastures.

Expanding such a number can only be achieved by remediation of soil in a certain area in order to make the land fertile. Such an intervention requires a huge investment that can be amortized only in a long period of time. Therefore, to meet the increasing demand, countries are forced to drastically increase the productivity of the land they dispose. This is where induced innovation steps in.

In order to best explain how Hicks’s theory works, consider a situation in which the demand for agricultural derived products increases as a result of either population growth or increased household income. Theory states that in such a situation, prices of inputs for which supply is inelastic will rise relative to prices of more elastic inputs. Similarly, if the supply of a particular input increases at a faster rate than the supply of other inputs, the price of such input will decline relative to the price of the other factors of production used. Ideally then, farmers would be looking to replace or use less of the more inelastic and less responsive factors of production since they are the more expensive to use. Therefore, technical innovations that replace such inputs would guarantee less costs and hence more profits. In other words, when demand for their products increases, farmers are lured by changes in relative prices to seek for technological alternatives that substitute the increasingly scarce factors of production.

Here is where government intervention would be beneficial. Agricultural workers cannot develop these innovations themselves and therefore demand that public research institutions develop new technologies that will then be transformed into modernized machinery that agricultural supply firms can sell to local farmers. Scientists will now study the best solution to this problem and respond by making the appropriate technical development such that producers can efficiently substitute the abundant inputs for the increasingly scarce factors. Ultimately this will lead to a reduction of farmer’s unit costs in the best way.

== See also ==
- Creativity techniques
- Frugal innovation
- International Innovation Index
