= Deirdre McCloskey =

American economist (born 1942)

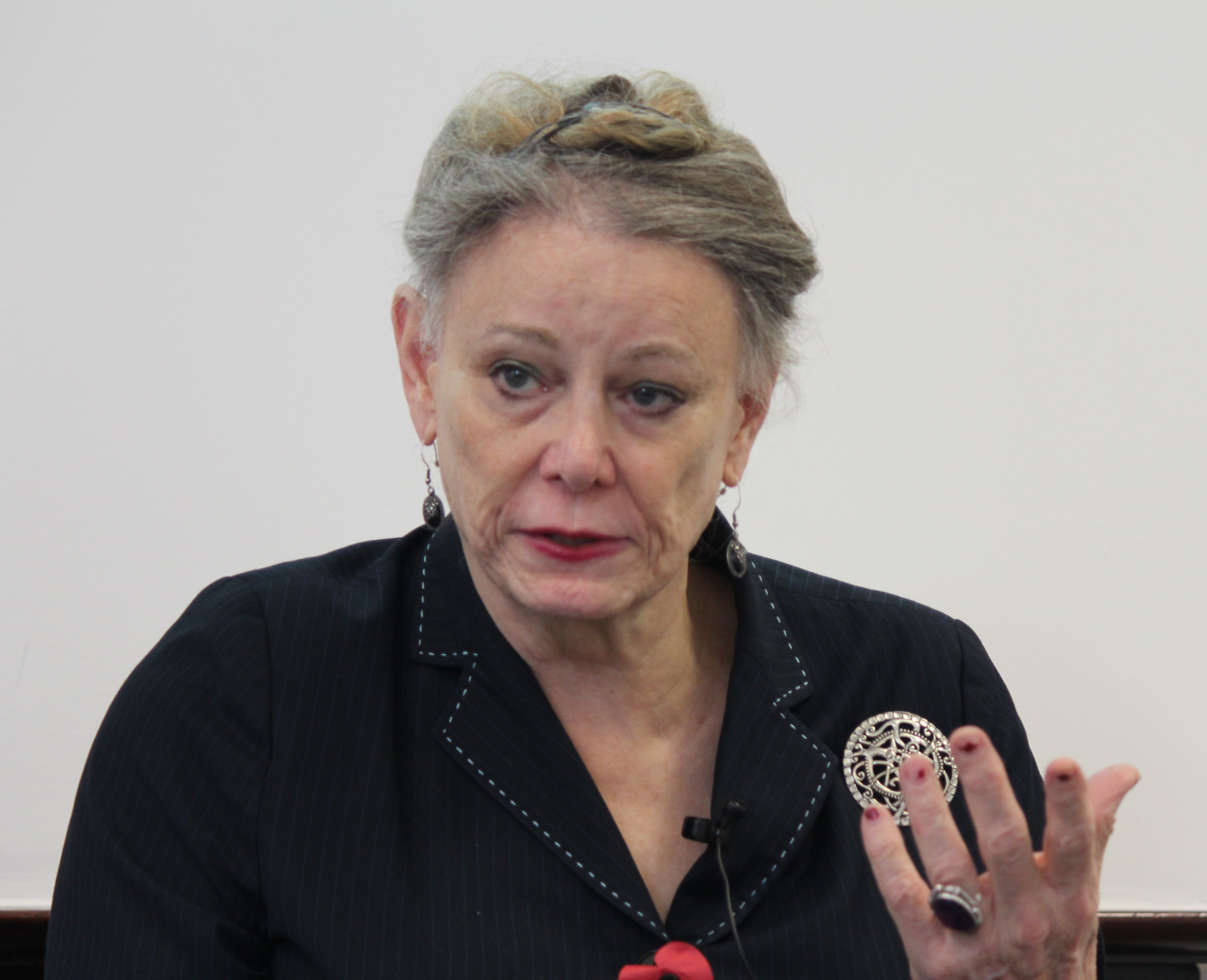
- McCloskey in 2014
- Born: September 11, 1942 (age 84); Ann Arbor, Michigan, U.S.
- Education: Harvard University (BA, MA, PhD)
- Known for: Economic history of Britain; McCloskey critique
- Scientific career
- Fields: Economic history Cliometrics; Economic methodology
- Thesis: Economic Maturity and Entrepreneurial Decline: British Iron and Steel, 1870–1913 (1970)
- Doctoral advisor: Alexander Gerschenkron
- Notable students: Stephen T. Ziliak; Claudia Goldin
- Website: deirdremccloskey.com

Deirdre Nansen McCloskey (born Donald Nansen McCloskey; September 11, 1942) is an American economist and academic. Since 2023 she has been a distinguished scholar and holder of the Isaiah Berlin Chair in Liberal Thought at the Cato Institute in Washington, D.C. From 2000 to 2015, she taught at the University of Illinois at Chicago, where she was a distinguished professor of economics and history and a professor of English and communication. During those years, she (as a visitor) taught economic history at the University of Gothenburg, economics at the University of the Free State, and philosophy at Erasmus University Rotterdam.

McCloskey holds twelve honorary doctorates. She has served as President of the Social Science History Association and the Economic History Association. Co-founder of the Cliometrics Society, she is a Fellow of the American Academy of Arts and Sciences and of the American Association for the Advancement of Science, and has been a fellow of the Guggenheim Foundation, the National Endowment for the Humanities, and the Institute for Advanced Study. Her research interests include the economic and political origins of the modern world, the misuse of statistical significance in economics and other sciences, British economic history, the rhetoric of economics, and the history and philosophy of liberalism, among others.

== Career ==
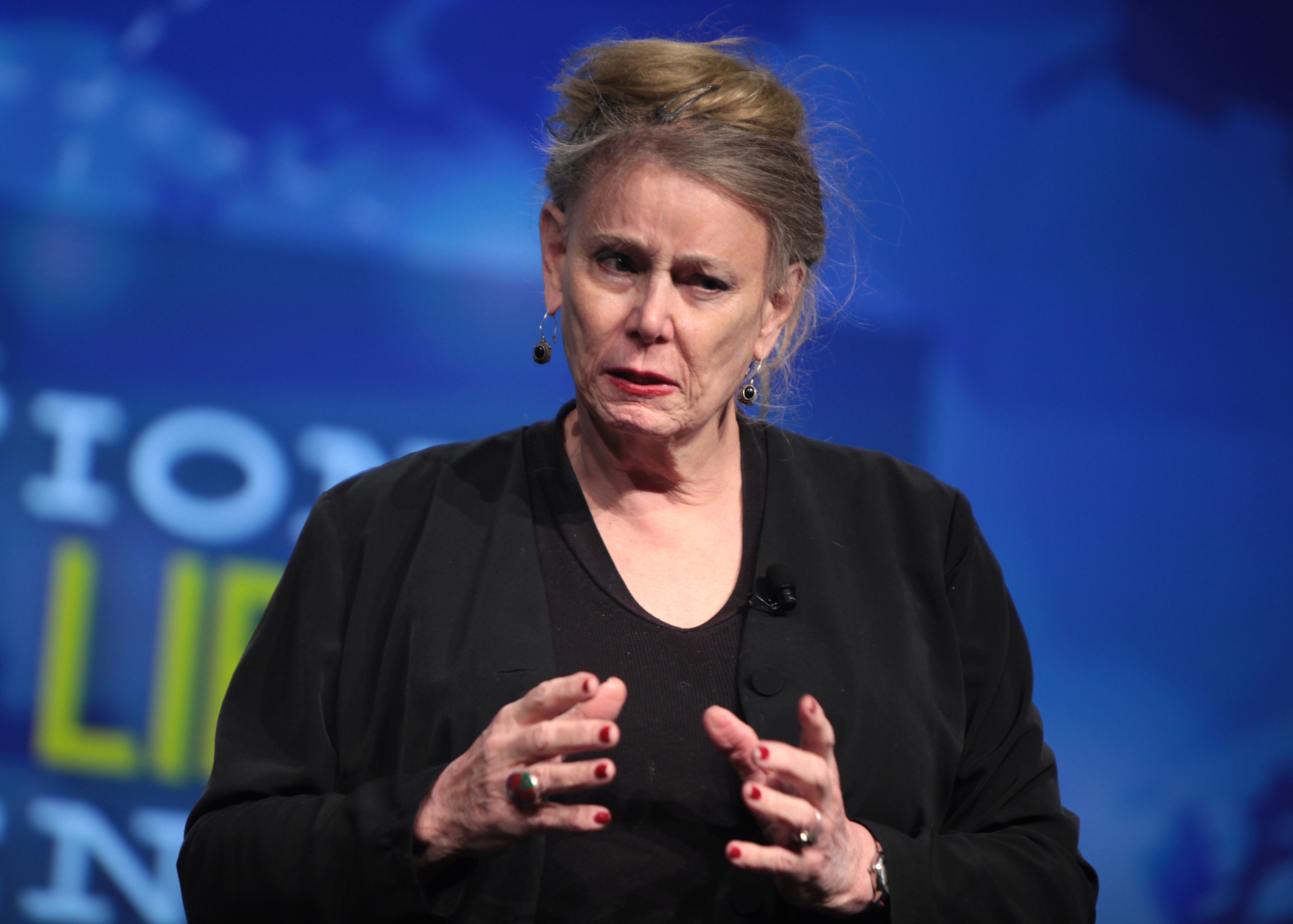
McCloskey speaking in 2015 in Washington, D.C.

Born in Ann Arbor, McCloskey received an AB in economics from Harvard University in 1964, and a PhD in economics from Harvard in 1970, where she studied under Alexander Gerschenkron. Her doctoral dissertation on the British iron and steel industry won the 1973 David A. Wells Prize.

In 1968, McCloskey became an assistant professor of economics at the University of Chicago, and then associate professor in 1973; she was tenured in 1975, and appointed simultaneously as associate professor of history in 1979. Her work at Chicago is marked by her contribution to the cliometric revolution in economic history, and teaching generations of leading economists Chicago Price Theory, a course which culminated in her book The Applied Theory of Price. In 1979, at the suggestion of Wayne Booth in English at Chicago, she turned to the study of rhetoric in economics. Worried in 1980 when her colleagues in economics would not promote her to full professor, McCloskey left Chicago for the University of Iowa, where she taught until 1999, being appointed the John F. Murray Chair in Economics in 1984. Soon after joining Iowa, she published The Rhetoric of Economics (1985) and co-founded with John S. Nelson, Allan Megill, and others an institution and graduate program, the Project on Rhetoric of Inquiry. In 1996 at Iowa she and Stephen Ziliak published a seminal paper of econometrics, "The Standard Error of Regressions" in Journal of Economic Literature, marking the beginning of a decades-long collaboration, led mostly by Ziliak, on the history, philosophy, and practice of statistical significance testing and estimation in economics, medicine, and other sciences.

McCloskey has authored or co-authored 25 books and nearly 500 articles. Her major contributions have been to the economic history of Britain (focusing on 19th-century trade and industry, and medieval agriculture), the quantification of historical inquiry (cliometrics), the rhetoric of economics, the rhetoric of the human sciences, economic methodology, virtue ethics, feminist economics, heterodox economics, the role of mathematics in economic analysis, the use (and misuse) of significance testing in economics, her trilogy "The Bourgeois Era," and the origins of modern economic growth.

== Bourgeois trilogy ==
Her book The Bourgeois Virtues: Ethics for an Age of Commerce, published in 2006, argued that the bourgeoisie exhibits all of the seven virtues of the Western Tradition.

A second, Bourgeois Dignity: Why Economics Can't Explain the Modern World, was published in 2010, and argued that the unprecedented increase in human welfare of the 19th and 20th centuries, from $3 per capita per day to over $100 per day, issued not from capitalist accumulation but from innovation under an unprecedented liberalism in northwest Europe and its offshoots.

The third, Bourgeois Equality: How Ideas, Not Capital or Institutions, Enriched the World (2016) explains the origins of the liberalism that made the modern world. The trilogy gives a new, and old, account of the nature and causes of the wealth of nations.

A popular version of the trilogy is Leave Me Alone and I'll Make You Rich: How the Bourgeois Deal Enriched the World (co-authored with Art Carden) in 2022.

Why Liberalism Works: How True Liberal Values Produce a Freer, More Equal, Prosperous World for All (2019) and much of her recent work develops a full-scale defense of true liberalism.

== Personal life ==
McCloskey was born Donald Nansen McCloskey on September 11, 1942 in Ann Arbor, Michigan, the eldest of three children. Her parents were historian Robert Green McCloskey (1916–1969) and singer-poet Helen Stueland McCloskey (1922–2021; née Stueland), who had married the year previous. McCloskey's birth preceded that of Professor Emeritus Laura McCloskey of IU Bloomington and playwright John Stewart McCloskey (1955–2025).

On September 11, 1964, McCloskey's 22nd birthday, it was reported in The Boston Globe that her engagement to the nursing professor Joanne Marie Comi (1942–) had been announced by the latter's parents, girls' basketball coach Dario Joseph "Doc" Comi (1913–1990) and bookkeeper Margaret M. "Marg" Comi (1916–2001; née Cabak). McCloskey and Comi's wedding ceremony took place on June 19, 1965 at 11:30 a.m. at the now-defunct St. Mary's Church in St. Albans, Vermont. The couple were married for 30 years and had two children, Daniel "Dan" McCloskey (1969–) and Margaret "Meg" McCloskey (1975–).

McCloskey began her transition into a woman in 1995, being among the first academics to do so. This decision placed considerable strain on her marriage as her wife found the change deeply distressing and ultimately could not accept it, despite McCloskey's efforts to preserve the relationship. On November 13 of that year, the same day that McCloskey underwent a legal name change, the couple divorced. The breakdown of the marriage and the resulting estrangement from her family was documented by McCloskey in Crossing: A Memoir (1999), a New York Times Notable Book of the Year and finalist for the 2000 Lambda Literary Award for Transgender Literature. Comi has since remarried to one William Bruce Dochterman of Swisher, Iowa.

McCloskey has advocated on behalf of the rights of persons and organizations in the LGBTQ community.

In 2003, McCloskey was a vocal critic of J. Michael Bailey after the release of his book The Man Who Would Be Queen, which presented and popularized sexologist Ray Blanchard's theory of autogynephilia as a motivation for sex reassignment surgery. McCloskey initiated complaints against Bailey at Northwestern University and the Illinois Department of Professional Regulation, and assisted a few others to do the same; all such complaints were ultimately either dismissed or resolved in Bailey's favor. She also led a successful campaign pressuring the Lambda Literary Foundation to withdraw the book's previous nomination for one of its awards.

McCloskey has described herself as a "literary, quantitative, postmodern, free-market, progressive Episcopalian, Midwestern woman from Boston who was once a man. Not 'conservative'! I'm a Christian Classical Liberal."

McCloskey ran as the Libertarian Party candidate in the 2022 Illinois Comptroller election against incumbent Democrat Susana Mendoza, coming in third with 1.9% of the vote.

== Publications ==
- Essays on a Mature Economy: Britain after 1840 (1971) ISBN 978-0691051987
- Economic Maturity and Entrepreneurial Decline: British Iron & Steel, 1870–1913 (1973) ISBN 978-0674428478
- Enterprise and Trade in Victorian Britain: Essays in Historical Economics (1981) ISBN 978-0415313056
- The Applied Theory of Price (1982 & 1985) ISBN 978-0023785207
- The Rhetoric of Economics (1985 & 1998) ISBN 978-0299158149
- The Writing of Economics (1987) reprinted as Economical Writing (2000) ISBN 978-1577660637
- Econometric History (1987) ISBN 978-0333213711
- The Rhetoric of the Human Sciences: Language and Argument in Scholarship and Public Affairs (1987) ISBN 978-0299110246
- The Consequences of Economic Rhetoric (1988) ISBN 978-0521342865
- A Bibliography of Historical Economics to 1980 (1990) ISBN 978-0521153850
- If You're So Smart: The Narrative of Economic Expertise (1990) ISBN 978-0226556710
- Second Thoughts: Myths and Morals of U.S. Economic History (1993) (edited) ISBN 978-0195101188
- Knowledge and Persuasion in Economics (1994), Cambridge University Press. ISBN 978-0521436038
- The Vices of Economists, the Virtues of the Bourgeoisie (1996) ISBN 978-9053562444
- Measurement and Meaning in Economics: The Essential Deirdre McCloskey (1999) (edited by Stephen Ziliak) ISBN 978-1852788186
- Crossing: A Memoir (S1999). New edition University of Chicago Press, 2000, ISBN 978-0226556697
- The Secret Sins of Economics (2002), University of Chicago Press. ISBN 978-0971757530
- The Bourgeois Virtues : Ethics for an Age of Commerce (2006), University of Chicago Press. ISBN 978-0226556635
- The Cult of Statistical Significance: How the Standard Error Costs Us Jobs, Justice, and Lives (2008), University of Michigan Press (with Stephen T. Ziliak). ISBN 978-0472050079
- The Economic Conversation (2008) (with Arjo Klamer and Stephen Ziliak) ISBN 978-0230506800
- Bourgeois Dignity: Why Economics Can't Explain the Modern World (2010), University of Chicago Press. ISBN 978-0226556659
- Bourgeois Equality: How Ideas, Not Capital or Institutions, Enriched the World (2016), University of Chicago Press. ISBN 978-0226333991
- The Oxford Handbook of Professional Economic Ethics (2016), Oxford University Press. (with George F. DeMartino). ISBN 978-0199766635
- Why liberalism works: how true liberal values produce a freer, more equal, prosperous world for all (2019), Yale University Press. ISBN 978-0300235081
- Bettering Humanomics: A New, and Old, Approach to Economic Science (2021), University of Chicago Press. ISBN 978-0226765921
- Beyond Positivism, Behaviorism, and Neoinstitutionalism in Economics (2022), University of Chicago Press. ISBN 978-0226819440
- Liberdade: 100 Conversations Starters on Liberalism, Latin America, and Brazil (2025) ISBN 979-8312780574

== Articles ==
- McCloskey, Deirdre (1980). "Review of Stratton and Brown's agricultural records in Britain". Journal of Economic History. 40 (March 1980): 189. doi:10.1017/S0022050700104735. S2CID 154867548.
- McCloskey, Deirdre (May 1985). "The loss function has been mislaid: The rhetoric of significance tests". The American Economic Review: Papers and Proceedings. 75 (2): 201–205. JSTOR 1805596.
- McCloskey, Deirdre N. (February 1988). "The rhetoric of law and economics". Michigan Law Review. 86 (4): 752–767. doi:10.2307/1289214. JSTOR 1289214.
- McCloskey, Deirdre (September 1995). "Modern epistemology against analytic philosophy: A reply to Mäki". Journal of Economic Literature. 33 (3): 1319–1323. JSTOR 2729124.
- McCloskey, Deirdre; Ziliak, Stephen T. (March 1996). "The standard error of regressions". Journal of Economic Literature. 34 (1): 97–114. JSTOR 2729411. Pdf.
- McCloskey, Deirdre (January 1998). "Simulating Barbara". Feminist Economics. 4 (3): 181–186. doi:10.1080/135457098338383.
- McCloskey, Deirdre (Winter 2003). "Other Things Equal: Milton". Eastern Economic Journal. 29 (1): 143–146. JSTOR 40326463.
- McCloskey, Deirdre; Ziliak, Stephen T. (2004). "Size matters: The standard error of regressions in the American Economic Review". Econ Journal Watch. 1 (2): 331–338. Pdf.
- McCloskey, Deirdre (July–August 2009). "Rhetoric matters: Ethical standards in a humanistic science of economics". Challenge. 52 (4): 25–31. doi:10.2753/0577-5132520403. JSTOR 40722588. S2CID 144681445.
- McCloskey, Deirdre N.; Roberts, Helen (July–September 2012). "What economics should we teach before college, if any?". The Journal of Economic Education. 43 (3): 293–299. doi:10.1080/00220485.2012.686396. JSTOR 23248956. S2CID 144429500.

== See also ==
- List of feminist economists
