= Hicks-neutral technical change =

Type of technical change in a production function

Hicks-neutral technical change, which plays an important role in growth theory, is a technical change in the production function of a business or industry that increases the marginal product of the production factors by the same proportion.

== Concept ==
The concept of Hicks neutrality was first put forth in 1932 by John Hicks in his book The Theory of Wages. According to Hicks, a neutral invention is "An invention which raises the marginal productivity of labour and capital in same proportion". In the example of one product and two production factors, a technical change is considered to be Hicks-neutral if it does not affect the ratio between the marginal productivity of capital and labour along the expansion path, a curve that describe a firm's optimal input mix as output grows.

== Formula ==
Assume that $Y(t) = A(t) (F(K(t),L(t)) \,$ where $Y(t)$ denotes the output at time $t$, $K(t)$ is the level of physical capital at time $t$, $L(t)$ is the amount of labor at time $t$, and $A(t)$ is the level of technology at time $t$. A Hicks-neutral change is one which only changes $A$.

The level of technology, $A$, does not affect the technical rate of substitution:

$RTS_{K(t),L(t)}=\frac{A(t)F_K}{A(t)F_L}=\frac{F_K}{F_L}$

The condition for a firm's maximization problem, which also implicitly describes the expansion path, is

$\frac{A(t)F_K}{A(t)F_L} = \frac{r}{w}$

where $r$ is the real interest rate (assuming that capital fully depreciates between two consecutive periods) and $w$ is the wage rate. Therefore, an increase in $A$ does not change ratio capital/labor at equilibrium.

Assuming a Cobb-Douglas production function with constant returns to scale, the Hicks-neutral technical change takes the form

$Y(t)=A(t)F(K(t),L(t))=A(t)K(t)^\alpha L(t)^{1-\alpha}$

where $0<\alpha<1$ is the elasticity of capital with respect to output.

By dividing the former equation by $L(t)$, we obtain

$\frac{Y(t)}{L(t)}=A(t)K(t)^\alpha L(t)^{-\alpha}$

Now, the output per unit of labour is $y(t)=A(t)k(t)^\alpha$, where $y(t)$ is the output per unit of labour and $k(t)$ is the capital per unit of labour. That is, a technological change increases the output per unit of labour by $A(t)$.

== Influence and later work ==
In 1988, Oded Galor demonstrated with the overlapping generation model that contrary to the results obtained in a static one-good, two-factor framework, a Hicks-neutral technological progress changes the ratio of factor prices in the long run through its effect on capital formation. The adoption of Hicks-neutral superior technology leads to an increase in factor prices in the short run, assuming fixed factor supply. In the long run, however, the rise in factor prices leads to capital formation, which raises the wage rate and lowers the interest rate. The motivation behind this result is that in a general equilibrium, a technological improvement increases the capital/labor ratio at the steady-state by $A(t)$. An increase in the capital/labor ratio at the steady-state lowers the interest rate (as the supply of capital increases) and therefore, increases the wage rate (since an increase in the capital/labour ratio increase the marginal product of labour, thus increase the demand for labour).

A 2018 paper finds that Hicks-neutral technological change causes output growth of approximately 2% per year.

Another 2018 paper use panel data from Spain and finds that in addition to labor-augmenting technological change, Hicks-neutral technological change causes output to grow, on average, in the vicinity of 1.5 percent per year.

A 2024 paper examines the effect of technological progress on agricultural total factor productivity (TFP) across 18 the Organization for Economic Cooperation and Development (OECD) countries from 1973 to 2015. The paper finds that technological progress is the predominant driver of agricultural TFP growth. Yet, after 2000, this progress slows. This deceleration of progress reflects a shift from Hicks-neutral to labor-augmenting technological change that favors capital-intensive economies and amplifies cross country TFP differences.

== See also ==
- List of production functions
