= Stephen Ziliak =

American professor (born 1963)

Stephen T. Ziliak (born October 17, 1963) is an American economist, author, and educator. He is currently professor of economics at Roosevelt University in Chicago, Illinois. He previously taught at the Georgia Institute of Technology, Emory University, and Bowling Green State University. Much of his work has focused on welfare and poverty, rhetoric, public policy, and the history and philosophy of science and statistics. Most known for his works on statistical significance, Ziliak challenged the fundamental theory and practice of statistical significance testing in his 1996 article, "The Standard Error of Regressions", in a sequel study in 2004 called "Size Matters", and in a book,The Cult of Statistical Significance: How the Standard Error Costs Us Jobs, Justice, and Lives (2008) all coauthored with Deirdre McCloskey.

== Career ==
Ziliak received in 1986 a Bachelor of Arts degree in Economics from Indiana University Bloomington; in 1996 he received a PhD in economics and a PhD Certificate in the Rhetoric of the Human Sciences, both from the University of Iowa. At Indiana he was a close student of H. Scott Gordon. While in graduate school at the University of Iowa, he served as resident scholar in the Project on Rhetoric of Inquiry, where he met among others Steve Fuller, Bruno Latour, and Wayne C. Booth, and co-authored (with Deirdre N. McCloskey) a seminal paper of econometrics, "The Standard Error of Regressions".

Following the completion of his PhD degrees, he has taught at Bowling Green State University, Emory University, Georgia Institute of Technology, and (currently) Roosevelt University, and he has been a visiting professor at more than a dozen other universities, law schools, and medical centers across the United States and Europe. In 2002 he won the Helen Potter Award for Best Article in Social Economics ("Pauper Fiction in Economic Science: `Paupers in Almshouses' and the Odd Fit of Oliver Twist"). In that same year at Georgia Tech he won the "Faculty Member of the Year" award and in 2003 he was voted "Most Intellectual Professor".

After college, but prior to his academic career, Ziliak served as county welfare caseworker and, following that, labor market analyst for the Indiana Department of Workforce Development, both in Indianapolis.

== Work on statistical significance ==
While at the University of Iowa, Ziliak became friends with his dissertation adviser, Deirdre McCloskey. He and McCloskey shared an interest in the fields of rhetoric and statistical significance — namely how the two concepts merge in modern economics. Ziliak had discovered one big cost of the "significance mistake" early on in his job with Workforce Development, in 1987. By U.S. Department of Labor policy he learned he was not allowed to publish black youth unemployment rates for Indiana's labor markets: "not statistically significant," the Labor Department said, meaning the p-values exceeded 0.10 (p less than or equal to 0.10 was the Labor Department's bright line cut-off for publishing estimates).

In their paper, "The Standard Error of Regressions," McCloskey and Ziliak argue that econometrics greatly over-values and misuses statistical significance testing — Student's t-test. They claim econometricians rely too heavily on statistical significance, but too little on "actual" economic significance. The paper also reviews and critiques over 40 years' worth of published papers in economic journals on their use of statistical significance.

In a reply to critics, Ziliak and McCloskey did a follow-up study of the 1996 research and claimed that the significance problem had grown even larger, causing false inferences and decisions in from 70% in the 1980s to 80% of the 1990s articles published in the American Economic Review. "Size Matters: The Standard Error of Regressions in the American Economic Review" was presented by Ziliak at the 2004 meetings of the American Economic Association. The article and a reply to critics ("Significance Redux") were published in a special issue of the Journal of Socio-Economics. Published cooperatively at the same time in Econ Journal Watch (2004), "Size Matters" maintains its rank as one of the top-most downloaded articles in that journal's history.

Ziliak was a lead author on the twenty-four statistician team which crafted in 2015-2016 the "American Statistical Association Statement on Statistical Significance and P-Values," edited by Ronald Wasserstein and Nicole Lazar.

His article "How Large are Your G-values? Try Gosset's Guinnessometrics When a Little 'p' Is Not Enough" was published in a follow-up special issue of The American Statistician (2019 73 sup1), a major re-think of statistical testing, estimation, and reporting in "A world beyond p<0.05" for which Ziliak also served as associate editor.

== The Cult of Statistical Significance ==
His book, The Cult of Statistical Significance: How the Standard Error Costs Us Jobs, Justice, and Lives (2008) challenges the history, philosophy, and practice of all the testing sciences, from economics to medicine, and has been widely reviewed in journals and the media. It was the beer-brewing Gosset aka "Student", Ziliak discovered in the archives, not the biologist R. A. Fisher, who provided the firmer foundation for modern statistics, decisions, and experimental design. The book featured in a 2011 U.S. Supreme Court case, Matrixx Initiatives v. Siracusano et al., wherein the justices unanimously decided against using statistical significance as a standard for adverse event reporting in U.S. securities law. Ziliak and McCloskey were invited to submit to the court a brief of amici curiae ("friends of the court") wherein they explain the most important differences between economic, legal, and human significance versus mere statistical significance. Ziliak wrote about the case for Significance magazine, inspiring published letters from A.W.F. Edwards and Dennis Lindley, who later befriended Ziliak in correspondence over W.S. Gosset and R.A. Fisher.

== Haiku Economics ==
In 2002, Ziliak published a poetry collection in Rethinking Marxism called "Haiku economics". According to the Editors, "Haiku is the poetic form par excellence of condensed, lyrical and enigmatic, thoughts and observations about the world. . . It may be difficult (many would say impossible) to make economic discourse poetic; but it is certainly possible, as Ziliak clearly demonstrates, to use poetry to penetrate the myths that circulate in the world of the Econ" Ziliak's most famous haiku is:

Invisible hand;

mother of inflated hope,

mistress of despair!

His invisible hand haiku has been erroneously credited to Etheridge Knight and Matsuo Basho. In 2008 and 2009 Ziliak's work on haiku economics gained international attention following a series of articles published in the Wall Street Journal, The Economist, The Chronicle of Higher Education, and National Public Radio. In 2011 he published an essay in Poetry magazine, "Haiku Economics: On Money, Metaphor, and the Invisible Hand," cited by the editors as one of the most-read articles of 2011.

== Guinnessometrics ==
Ziliak takes an economic approach to uncertainty he calls Guinnessometrics, a wholesale rethinking of experimental philosophy and econometric practice. He argues that randomization plus statistical significance does not equal validity, but that it must be proven by other means, including deliberately balanced and stratified experiments, small series of independent and repeated samples controlling for real error, and an economic approach to the logic of uncertainty.

In July 2008 Ziliak was invited by the International Biometric Society and the Irish Statistical Association to present his work in Dublin on "Guinnessometrics: The Economic Foundation of Student's t," in celebration of the 100th anniversary of W.S. Gosset's aka "Student's" t-distribution and test. In 2010 Ziliak and British statistician Stephen Senn exchanged views in The Lancet.

== Renganomics and rap ==
Ziliak's other contributions include a competitive learning game he calls renganomics. Renganomics is a combination of economic science with an ancient Japanese poetic form called renga. The idea is to create a spontaneous, collaboratively written poem about the economy and economic science in the form of linked classical haiku poems (5-7-5 sound counts) followed by two lines of 7 sounds (14 sounds for the couplet). The renga form is created by writing a verse and then passing the poem on to the next person in the circle, given a predetermined time constraint and stakes. It is supposed to challenge notions of the spontaneous order and central planning alike, while allowing both policies to air ideas, desires, and complaints.

In May 2015 Ziliak produced an economics rap video with his students at Roosevelt University, "Fear the Economics Textbook (Story of the Next Crook)". The video, featured in Inside Higher Ed, The National Review, Rethinking Economics and elsewhere, is in part a statement of Ziliak's pluralist and dialogical teaching philosophy and view of history, and at the same time a reply to the popular Keynes-Hayek rap videos.

== Welfare reform ==
After completing his dissertation, "Essays on Self-Reliance: The United States in the Era of Scientific Charity," he was an associate editor of and contributor to the millennial edition of Historical Statistics of the United States: Colonial Times to the Present (General Eds. S. Carter, R. Sutch, et al.) Ziliak argued in his dissertation and in a series of articles against the 1996 welfare reform act (PRWORA). He argued on the basis of novel econometric and social historical evidence he produced on previous, 19th century attempts to abolish welfare and to replace it with private charity ("scientific charity", so called). Economic theory of welfare is distorted, he argued, by a "Malthusian vice" and "Contradiction of compassion". Private charity expanded more than previous observers predicted. But labor market outcomes were about the same as one finds in late 20th century welfare programs.

== Ethics and economics ==
Ziliak's historical research on previous attempts to privatize welfare for the poor has questioned the virtue-ethical philosophies of Victorians, Old and New, from Herbert Spencer to Gertrude Himmelfarb. In The Bourgeois Virtues (2006, xviii) his former dissertation adviser and long-time coauthor Deirdre N. McCloskey thanks Ziliak (together with Arjo Klamer and Helen McCloskey, Deirdre's mother) for "disagreeing with me about the bourgeois virtues". The Cult of Statistical Significance drew attention to the ethics of statistical significance testing and the frequently large yet neglected consequences for human and other life when the test is misused and misinterpreted as Ziliak and McCloskey claim it frequently is. Haiku economics is fundamentally an attempt to bring feelings and individual experience back inside the dismal science. In his 2011 essay on "Haiku Economics," published in Poetry magazine, Ziliak noted the influence of Adam Smith's The Theory of Moral Sentiments and John Stuart Mill's Autobiography. More recently, In a series of papers comparing Gosset's deliberately balanced experimental designs with Fisher's randomized, Ziliak argues that most randomized controlled trials lack both ethical and economic justification. His paper "The Unprincipled Randomization Principle in Economics and Medicine" (with Edward Teather-Posadas), published in the Oxford Handbook of Professional Economic Ethics (2016), argues that most randomized controlled trials (RCTs) fail every ethical code, from Smith's "impartial spectator" and Pareto efficiency to Rawls's difference principle, except possibly "vulgar utilitarianism" (page 436), an "ethic" which even most economists reject.

== Books ==
- The Cult of Statistical Significance: How the Standard Error Costs Us Jobs, Justice, and Lives (University of Michigan Press, 2008). With Deirdre McCloskey.
- (contributor) Economical Writing: Thirty-Fives Rules for Clear and Persuasive Prose (University of Chicago Press, 2019, 3rd Edition) by Deirdre McCloskey with an appendix by Stephen T. Ziliak.
- (editor and contributor) Measurement and Meaning in Economics: The Essential Deirdre McCloskey (Edward Elgar, 2001).
- The Economic Conversation (forthcoming). With Arjo Klamer and Deirdre McCloskey.

== Selected articles ==
- Ziliak S T. (1996). The Standard Error of Regressions, Journal of Economic Literature Volume 34 (March): pages 97–114 (with D N McCloskey)
- Ziliak, Stephen T.; McCloskey, Deirdre N. (November 2004). "Size matters: the standard error of regressions in the American Economic Review". The Journal of Socio-Economics. 33 (5): 527–546. doi:10.1016/j.socec.2004.09.024.
- Ziliak S T. (2011) Haiku Economics: On Money, Metaphor, and the Invisible Hand, Poetry CXCVII (4, Jan.): pages 314–316
- Ziliak, Stephen T (October 2008). "Retrospectives: Guinnessometrics: The Economic Foundation of 'Student's' t". Journal of Economic Perspectives. 22 (4): 199–216. doi:10.1257/jep.22.4.199.
- Ziliak, Stephen T. (2011). "W.S. Gosset and Some Neglected Concepts in Experimental Statistics: Guinnessometrics II". Journal of Wine Economics. 6 (2): 252–277. doi:10.1017/S1931436100001632.
- Ziliak, Stephen T. (29 March 2019). "How Large Are Your G -Values? Try Gosset's Guinnessometrics When a Little 'p' Is Not Enough". The American Statistician. 73 (sup1): 281–290. doi:10.1080/00031305.2018.1514325.
- Ziliak, Stephen T.; Teather-Posadas, Edward R. (2016). "The Unprincipled Randomization Principle in Economics and Medicine". In Demartino, George F.; McCloskey, Deirdre (eds.). The Oxford Handbook of Professional Economic Ethics. pp. 422–452. doi:10.1093/oxfordhb/9780199766635.013.44. ISBN 978-0-19-976663-5.
- Ziliak S T. (2014) Balanced Versus Randomized Field Experiments in Economics: Why W.S. Gosset aka "Student" Matters, Review of Behavioral Economics 1 (Numbers 1–2): pages 167–208
- Ziliak, S T (2010). "The Validus Medicus and a New Gold Standard". The Lancet. 376 (9738): 324–325. doi:10.1016/S0140-6736(10)61174-9. PMID 20681063.
- Ziliak S T. (2010) Brief of Amici Curiae Statistics Experts Professors Deirdre N. McCloskey and Stephen T. Ziliak in Support of Respondents, Matrixx Initiatives v Siracusano et al. (vol. No. 09-1156, pp. 22). Washington DC: Supreme Court of the United States. Edward Labaton et al. Counsel of Record (with D N McCloskey)
- Ziliak, Stephen T (June 2004). "Self-Reliance Before the Welfare State: Evidence from the Charity Organization Movement in the United States". The Journal of Economic History. 64 (2): 433–461. doi:10.1017/S002205070400275X. ProQuest 216417885.
- Ziliak S T. (1996) The End of Welfare and the Contradiction of Compassion, The Independent Review I (1, Spring 1996): pages 55–73 The End of Welfare and the Contradiction of Compassion | Stephen T. Ziliak
- Ziliak, S T (1997). "Kicking the Malthusian Vice: Lessons from the Abolition of 'Welfare' in the Late Nineteenth Century". Quarterly Review of Economics and Finance. 37 (2): 449–68. doi:10.1016/S1062-9769(97)90037-5.
- Ziliak S T. (2001) D. N. McCloskey and the Rhetoric of a Scientific Economics, pp. ix-xxvi, in S. T. Ziliak, ed., Measurement and Meaning in Economics (2001).
- Ziliak S T. (2001) What are Models for?, In Warren J. Samuels and Jeff E. Biddle, eds., Research in the History of Economic Thought and Methodology 19-A (Elsevier Press, 2001): pages 149–159.
- Ziliak S T. (2002) Pauper Fiction in Economic Science: `Paupers in Almshouses' and the Odd Fit of Oliver Twist, Review of Social Economy 55 (2, June 2002): pages 159–181.
- Ziliak, Stephen (September 2002). "Haiku Economics". Rethinking Marxism. 14 (3): 111–112. doi:10.1080/089356902101242323.
- Ziliak S T (2004) The Significance of the Economics Research Paper, In Edward Fullbrook, ed., A Guide to What's Wrong with Economics (Anthem Press 2004), Chp. 21: pages 223–236.
