= Composite good =

In economics, a composite good is an abstraction that represents all but one of the goods in the relevant budget.

Consumer demand theory shows how the composite may be treated as if it were only a single good as to properties hypothesized about demand. The composite good represents what is given up along consumer's budget constraint to consume more of the first good.

== Reason for use ==
Budget constraints are designed to show the maximum amount of a good, or combination of goods, that can be purchased by a consumer given a limited budget. In a single-good world, the cost of a good cannot be related to any other opportunities. Therefore, opportunity costs cannot be calculated.

The addition of one new good to a single-good market allows for opportunity costs to be determined only in relation to that other good. However, its weakness is that it ignores all other possible choices. Trying to solve this problem by adding even more goods to the market makes analysis unwieldy. Under these circumstances, economic modelers are forced to choose between goods in order to create a simple model.

The concept of the composite good addresses this problem. The addition of a composite good in a single-good model (bringing it up to two) allows for all other opportunities to be accounted for. Since the composite is considered a single good only for purposes of the model, analysis can be made on a two-dimensional graph. Optimal choices represent the bundle of two goods; the first good and the composite.

A final step can be taken in relating the composite good to a unit of account such as money by setting the price of the composite good to 1. Since the prices of all other goods are known, the composite good can be converted into any combination of bundles that represent the optimal choice other than the first good. This final step clarifies the relation of the model to the real world where many goods can be stated in terms of money value. In John R. Hicks's classic Value and Capital (1939), a composite good was used to generalize mathematically from consumer demand equilibrium for an individual in the 2-good case to market equilibrium via supply and demand in the n-good case.

== See also ==
- Microeconomics
