= Leontief production function =

Function in economics

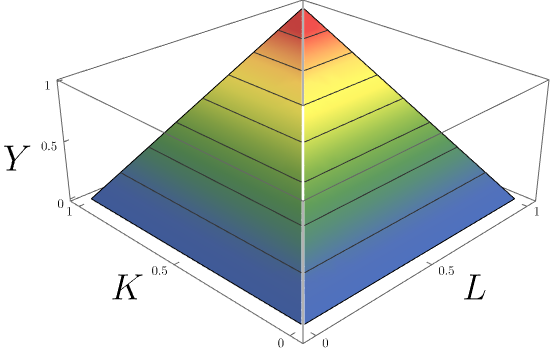
Two input Leontief Production Function with isoquants

In economics, the Leontief production function or fixed proportions production function is a production function that implies the factors of production which will be used in fixed (technologically predetermined) proportions, as there is no substitutability between factors. It was named after Wassily Leontief and represents a limiting case of the constant elasticity of substitution production function.

For the simple case of a good that is produced with two inputs, the function is of the form

$$q = \text{Min}\left(\frac{z_1}{a},\frac{z_2}{b}\right)$$

where q is the quantity of output produced, z_{1} and z_{2} are the utilised quantities of input 1 and input 2 respectively, and a and b are technologically determined constants.

== Example ==
In Wassily Leontief's original input–output formulation, the function relates consumption rates (flows per unit of time) to the output rate (flow per unit of time). In introductory microeconomics textbooks, however, it is often illustrated using static counts of discrete components (stocks): suppose that the intermediate goods "tires" and "steering wheels" are used in the production of automobiles (for simplicity of the example, to the exclusion of anything else). Then in the above formula q refers to the number of automobiles produced, z_{1} refers to the number of tires used, and z_{2} refers to the number of steering wheels used. Assuming each car requires 4 tires and 1 steering wheel, the Leontief production function is

Number of cars = Min{1/4 times the number of tires, 1 times the number of steering wheels}.

Strictly speaking, such discrete stock-based analogies conflate physical inventories with consumption flows—a dimensional distinction well known in macroeconomic and dynamical-systems modeling.

== Connection to ecological and biochemical kinetics ==
Mathematically, the Leontief production function is isomorphic to Liebig's law of the minimum in ecology and agronomy, under which growth or output is dictated by the scarcest limiting factor rather than total resource availability.

In interdisciplinary system-dynamics and consumer–resource modeling, this fixed-proportions relationship has been derived mechanistically from stock–flow kinetics analogous to enzyme-catalyzed biochemical reaction chains: when production units exhibit a saturated response to buffer inventory levels and weak inventory leakage, the steady-state output of a multi-resource chain collapses to a single bottleneck factor. Embedded into consumer–resource rate equations, this stock–flow Leontief–Liebig framework has been used to model technological diversity, resource-based competition between technologies, and innovation diffusion.

== See also ==
- Cobb–Douglas production function
- Isoquant
