= Value and Capital =

1939 book by John Richard Hicks

- Title page for Value and Capital: An Inquiry Into Some Fundamental Principles of Economic Theory (1939)
- Author: John Richard Hicks
- Language: English
- Genre: Non-fiction
- Publication date: 1939

Value and Capital: An Inquiry Into Some Fundamental Principles of Economic Theory is a book by the British economist John Richard Hicks, published in 1939. It is considered a classic exposition of microeconomic theory. Central results include:

- extension of consumer theory for individual and market equilibrium as to goods demanded with explicit use of only ordinal utility for individuals, rather than requiring interpersonal utility comparisons
- analysis of the 2-good as to effects of a price change and mathematical extension to any number of goods without loss of generality
- parallel results for production theory
- extension of general equilibrium theory of markets and adaptation of static-equilibrium theory to economic dynamics in distinguishing temporary and long-run equilibrium through expectation of agents.

== Outline and details ==
The book has 19 chapters and the following outline:

- Introduction
- Part I, The theory of subjective value
- Part II, General equilibrium
- Part III, The foundations of economic dynamics
- Part IV, The working of the dynamic system
- Mathematical appendix.

It begins with a simplified case and generalises from it. An individual consumer has a given money income for spending on only two goods. What determines quantity demanded of each good by that individual? The basic hypothesis is the set of restrictions on the utility function and demand equilibrium that results as to the consumer's budget constraint. That hypothesis drives the theoretical outcome of a price change in one of the goods on the quantity demanded of each good. The book decomposes the change into the substitution effect and the income effect. The latter is the change in real income in theoretical terms without which the distinction between real and nominal values would be more problematic. The two effects are now standard in consumer theory. The analysis conforms with a proportionate change in money income and money prices of both goods leaving quantity demanded of both goods unchanged. This is also consistent with the distinction between real and nominal values and represents a common hypothesis in economics of no money illusion.

An appendix generalises the 2-good case for consumption to the case of one good and a composite good, that is, all other consumer goods. It derives the conditions under which the demand properties in equilibrium as to the price ratio and the marginal rate of substitution attributed to the 2-good case apply to the more general case, allowing the neat distinction between the income effect and the substitution effect.

In his Nobel lecture, Hicks cites Value and Capital for clarifying an aspect of what became known as the aggregation problem. The problem is most acute in measuring the capital stock by its market value for the real-world case of heterogeneous capital goods (for example, steel presses and shovels). He showed that if the price ratios between the goods (equal to their marginal rates of substitution in equilibrium) did not remain constant with additional capital, aggregation of capital-good values would not be a strictly valid measure of the capital stock. He also showed that there was no unambiguous way of measuring the "period of production" (proposed by Böhm-Bawerk) that would in general serve as a measure of the capital stock.

From consumer equilibrium for an individual, the book aggregates to market equilibrium across all individuals, producers, and goods. In so doing, Hicks introduced Walrasian general equilibrium theory to an English-speaking audience. This was the first publication to attempt a rigorous statement of stability conditions for general equilibrium. In doing so, Hicks formalised comparative statics. The book synthesises dynamic-adjustment elements from Walras and Wicksell and from Marshall and Keynes. It distinguishes temporary, intermediate, and long-run equilibrium with expectations as to future market conditions affecting behaviour in current markets (Bliss, 1987, pp. 642–43).

== See also ==
- Hicksian demand function
