= An Essay on the Nature and Significance of Economic Science =

Work by Lionel Robbins

Lionel Robbins' Essay (1932, 1935, 2nd ed., 158 pp.) sought to define more precisely economics as a science and to derive substantive implications. Analysis is relative to "accepted solutions of particular problems" based on best modern practice as referenced, especially including the works of Philip Wicksteed, Ludwig von Mises, and other Continental European economists. Robbins disclaims originality but expresses hope to have given expository force on a very few points to some principles "not always clearly stated" (1935, pp. xiv-xvi)

== Major propositions ==
Robbins develops and defends several propositions about the relation of scarcity to economics and of economic theory to science, including the following.

- "Economics is the science which studies human behaviour as a relationship between ends and scarce means which have alternative uses." (1935, p. 15)
- "Economics is not about certain kinds of behaviour," but "a certain aspect of behaviour, the form imposed by the influence of scarcity." (pp. 16–17)
- "Economics is entirely neutral between ends; ... in so far as any end is dependent on scarce means, it is germane to the preoccupations of the economist." (p. 24)
- "[W]ealth is not wealth because of its substantial properties. It is wealth because it is scarce." (p. 47)
- "The Law of Diminishing Marginal Utility ..., whether true or false, can never be verified by observation or introspection." ... [Nor does it] "justify the inference that transferences from rich to poor would increase total satisfaction... Interesting as a development of an ethical postulate, [such an effect] does not at all follow from the positive assumptions of pure theory." (pp. 137, 141)
- Economics as science is about "ascertainable facts" of the positive as distinct from normative (ethical) judgments on economic policy. (p. 148).

The definition of economics above has been described as "central to the arguments presented" that followed in the Essay and as redefining economics in marginalist terms and thereby "destroy[ing] the view classical economists had of their science." Robbins argued that, at a certain stage in the development of the subject, an insufficiently restrictive and unifying definition multiplies activities of economists away from filling in explanatory gaps of the theory and solving problems posed by the subject (pp. 3–4).

The Essay has been described as different from earlier writings on economic methodology in generating a range of tightly argued, radical implications from a simple definition, for example in admitting an aspect of behaviour (rather than a list of behaviours) but not limiting the subject-matter of economics, provided that the influence of scarcity impinges on these (pp. 16–17). The broad behavioural definition is credited for its consistency with the expanding boundaries of economics decades later. In this Robbins both narrows the definition of economics, thereby demonstrating the usefulness of deduction, and opens up the subject-matter of economics.

== Influence ==
Robbins's Essay is one of the most-cited works on the methodology and philosophy of economics for the period 1932–1960. Arguments therein have been widely accepted on the demarcation of economics as science from discussion of recommendations on economic policy. In that period, economists started referring to Robbins' definition of economics therein as generally accepted, along with continuing controversy that accompanied its blending into economics texts. With the application of the economic methods to social and other "non-economic" problems, acceptance of Robbins' expansive subject-matter definition in economics texts increased its prominence.

== See also ==
- Economic welfare
- Social welfare function
- Welfare definition of economics
