= Goods =

Things or services that satisfy human wants

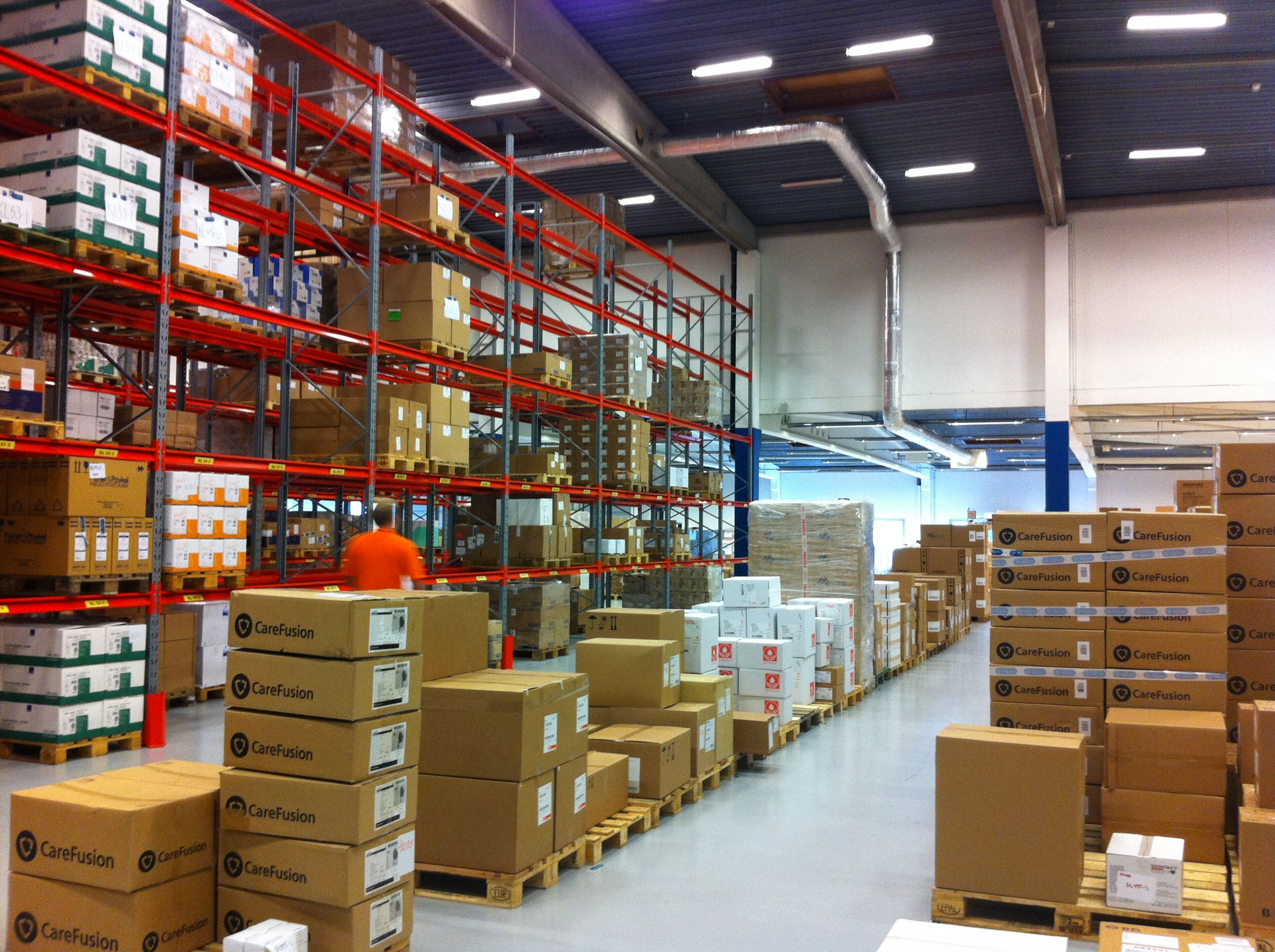
Tangible medical goods stacked in a warehouse

In certain economic contexts, goods are anything that is good, usually in the sense that it provides welfare or utility to someone. Goods can be contrasted with bads, i.e. things that provide negative value for users, like chores or waste products. A bad lowers a consumer's overall welfare.

Economics focuses on the study of economic goods, i.e. goods that are scarce; in other words, producing the good requires expending effort or resources. Economic goods contrast with free goods such as air, for which there is an unlimited supply.

Goods are the result of the secondary sector of the economy which involves the transformation of raw materials or intermediate goods into goods.

== Utility and characteristics of goods ==
The change in utility (pleasure or satisfaction) gained by consuming one unit of a good is called its marginal utility. Goods are commonly considered to have diminishing marginal utility, which means that consuming more gives less utility per amount consumed.

Some things are useful, but not scarce enough to have monetary value, such as the Earth's atmosphere or seawater; these are referred to as free goods.

Final goods are items that are ultimately consumed, rather than used in the production of another good. For example, a microwave oven or a bicycle that is sold to a consumer is a final good or consumer good, but the components that are sold to be used in those goods are intermediate goods. For example, textiles or transistors can be used to make clothes or electronic devices, but consumers usually have no use for them. Durable or long-lasting goods, such as machinery, human skills, or ecosystems, which in turn are used to produce further goods, are known as capital goods.

Commercial goods are construed as tangible products that are manufactured and then made available for supply to be used in an industry of commerce. Commercial goods could be tractors, commercial vehicles, mobile structures, airplanes, and even roofing materials. Commercial and personal goods as categories are very broad and cover almost everything a person sees from the time they wake up in their home, on their commute to work to their arrival at the workplace.

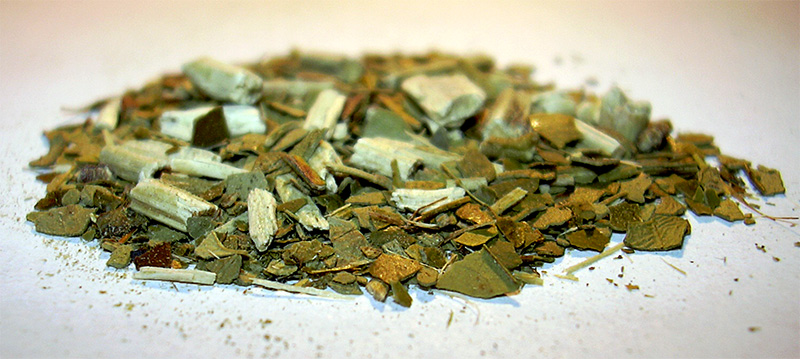
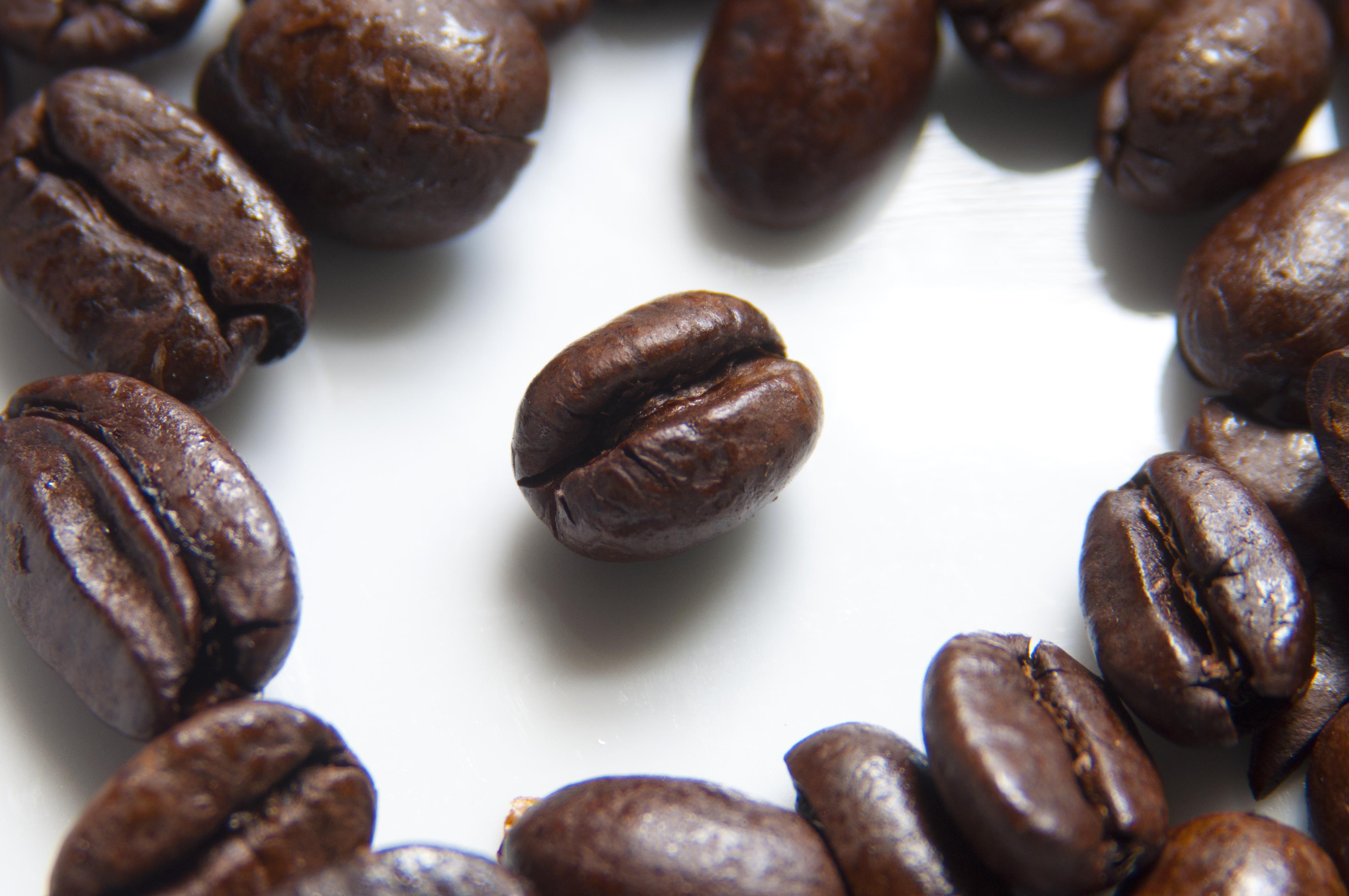
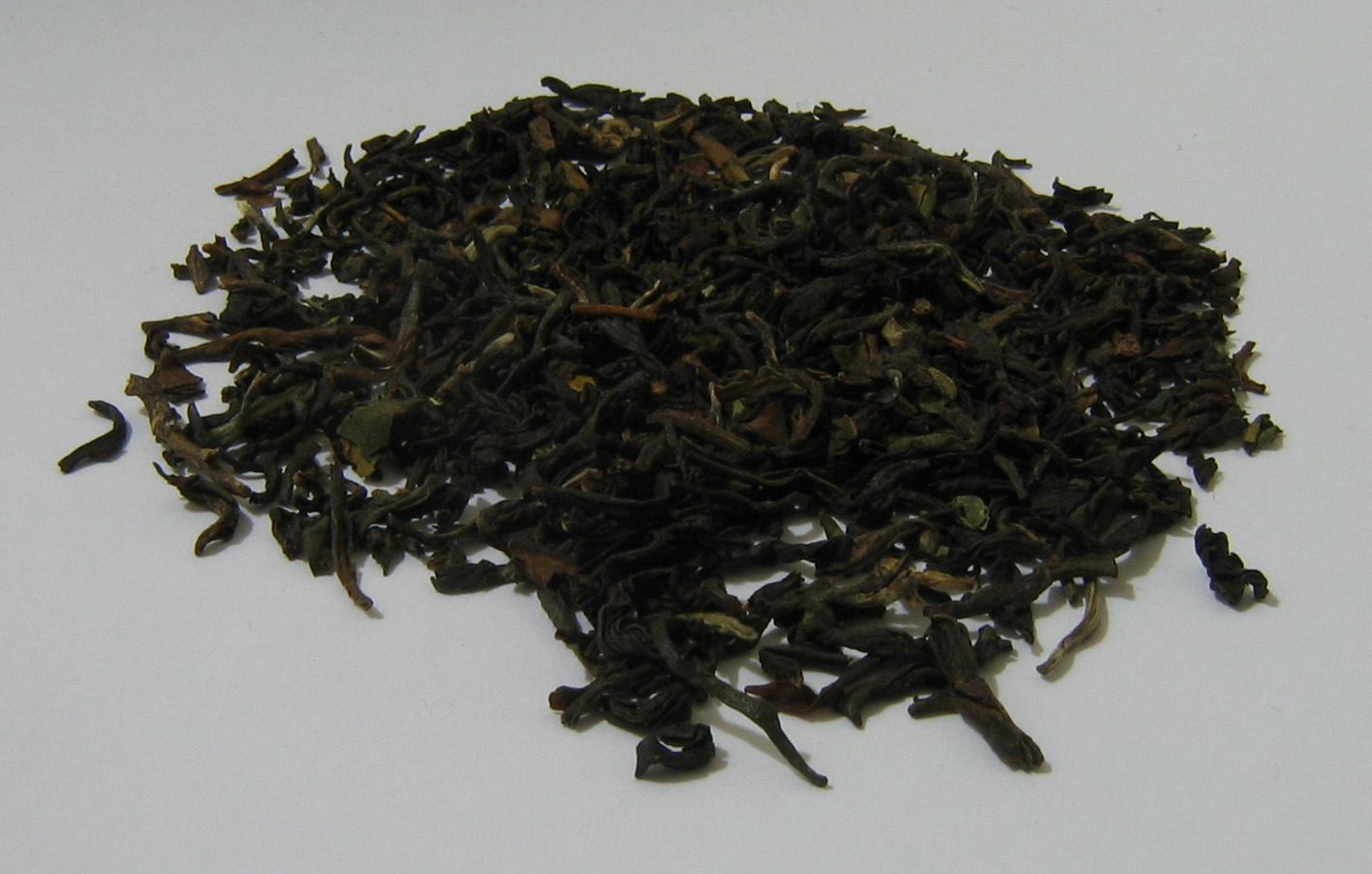
Yerba mate (left), coffee bean (middle) and tea (right), all used for caffeinated infusions, are commodity cash crops.

A Commodity may be used as a synonym for an economic good, but it often refers to marketable raw materials and primary products.

Although common goods are tangible, certain classes of goods, such as information, only take intangible forms. For example, among other goods an apple is a tangible object, while news belongs to an intangible class of goods and can be perceived only by means of an instrument such as printers or television.

== Types ==
There are a range of types of goods in economics, based on price elasticity of demand, including normal goods (which has subcategories of necessities and luxury goods) and inferior goods.

Goods' diversity allows for their classification into different categories based on distinctive characteristics, such as tangibility and (ordinal) relative elasticity. A tangible good like an apple differs from an intangible good like information due to the impossibility of a person to physically hold the latter, whereas the former occupies physical space. Intangible goods differ from services in that final (intangible) goods are transferable and can be traded, whereas a service cannot.

Price elasticity also differentiates types of goods. An elastic good is one for which there is a relatively large change in quantity due to a relatively small change in price, and therefore is likely to be part of a family of substitute goods; for example, as pen prices rise, consumers might buy more pencils instead. An inelastic good is one for which there are few or no substitutes, such as tickets to major sporting events, original works by famous artists, and prescription medicine such as insulin. Complementary goods are generally more inelastic than goods in a family of substitutes. For example, if a rise in the price of beef results in a decrease in the quantity of beef demanded, it is likely that the quantity of hamburger buns demanded will also drop, despite no change in buns' prices. This is because hamburger buns and beef (in Western culture) are complementary goods. Goods considered complements or substitutes are relative associations and should not be understood in a vacuum. The degree to which a good is a substitute or a complement depends on its relationship to other goods, rather than an intrinsic characteristic, and can be measured as cross elasticity of demand by employing statistical techniques such as covariance and correlation.

=== Bads ===
A bad, also known as a discommodity, is the opposite of a good or commodity, because its presence or consumption has negative utility and thus a negative price; its owner does not want it and will pay to be rid of it. With goods, a two-party transaction results in the purchaser exchanging money for a product. With a bad, however, both money and the object in question go the same direction, as when a household pays a waste collector to take away their garbage, meaning the garbage has a negative price (as the waste collector is receiving both garbage and money, implicitly paying a negative amount for the garbage).

== Exclusivity and competitiveness ==
=== Fourfold model of goods ===
Goods can be classified based on their degree of excludability and rivalry (competitiveness). Considering excludability can be measured on a continuous scale, some goods would not be able to fall into one of the four common categories used.

There are four types of goods based on the characteristics of rival in consumption and excludability: public goods, private goods, common resources, and club goods. These four types plus examples for anti-rivalry appear in the accompanying table.

| | Excludable | Non-excludable |
|---|---|---|
| Rivalrous | Private goods eg. food, clothing, parking spaces | Common-pool resources eg. fish stocks, timber |
| Non-rivalrous | Club goods eg. cinemas, software, private parks | Public goods eg. free-to-air television, air, national defense |

==== Public goods ====
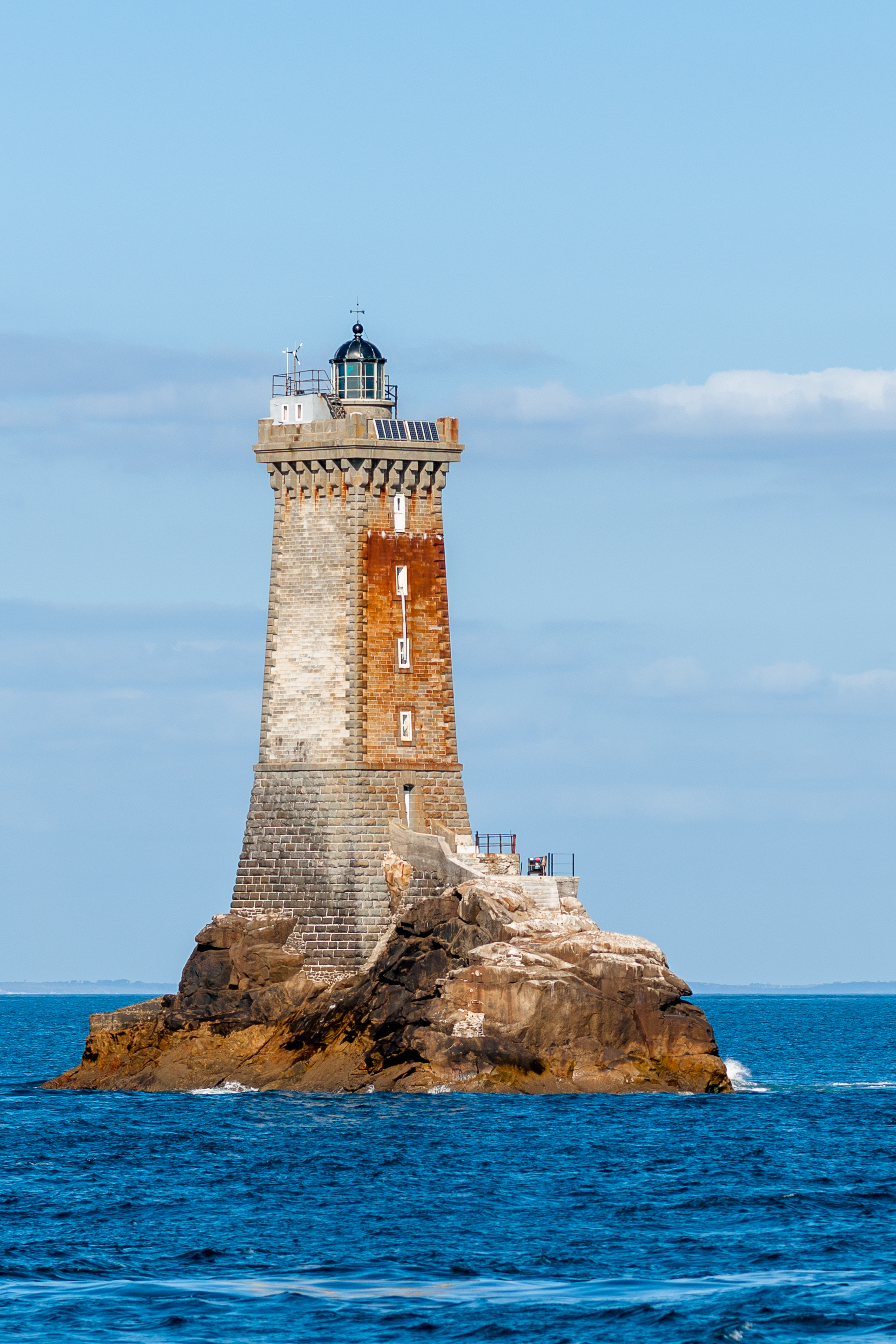
Aids to navigation such as lighthouses are often used as an example of a public good, as they benefit all maritime users, but no one can be excluded from using them.

Goods that are both non-rival and non-excludable are called public goods. In many cases, renewable resources, such as land, are common commodities but some of them are contained in public goods. Public goods are non-exclusive and non-competitive, meaning that individuals cannot be straightforwardly stopped from using them, and anyone can consume this good without hindering the ability of others to consume them. Examples in addition to the ones in the matrix are national parks, or firework displays. It is generally accepted by mainstream economists that the market mechanism will under-provide public goods, so these goods have to be produced by other means, including government provision. Public goods can also suffer from the Free-Rider problem.

==== Private goods ====
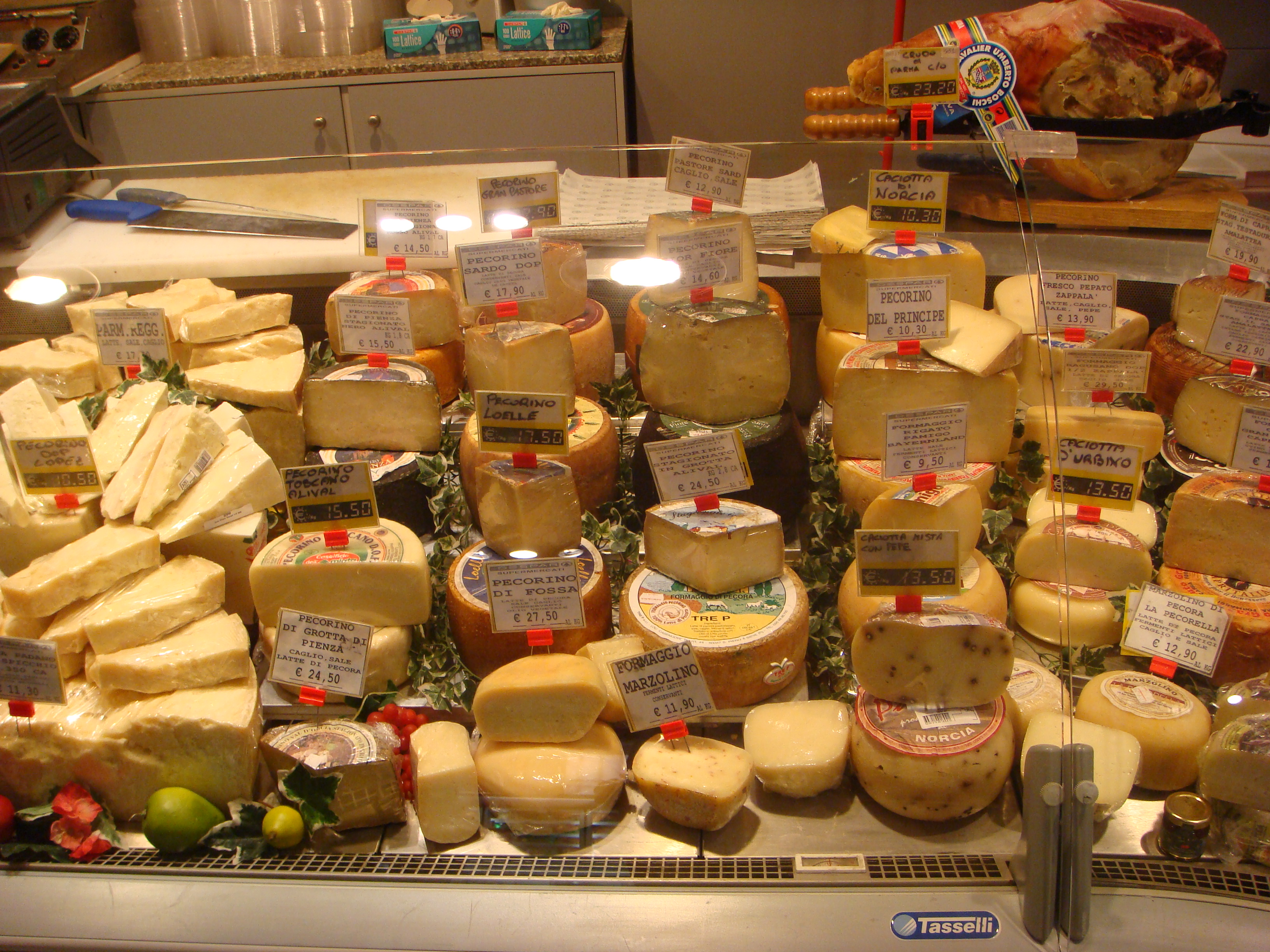
These cheeses are private goods. They are rivalrous, as the same piece of cheese can only be consumed once. They are also excludable, as it is possible for the store to prevent someone, such as a non-customer who will not pay the price, from consuming the cheese, as it is privately owned.

Private goods are excludable goods, which prevent other consumers from consuming them. Private goods are also rivalrous because one good in private ownership cannot be used by someone else. That is to say, consuming some goods will deprive another consumer of the ability to consume the goods. Private goods are the most common type of goods. They include what you have to get from the store. For examples food, clothing, cars, parking spaces, etc. An individual who consumes an apple denies another individual from consuming the same one. It is excludable because consumption is only offered to those willing to pay the price.

==== Common-pool resources ====
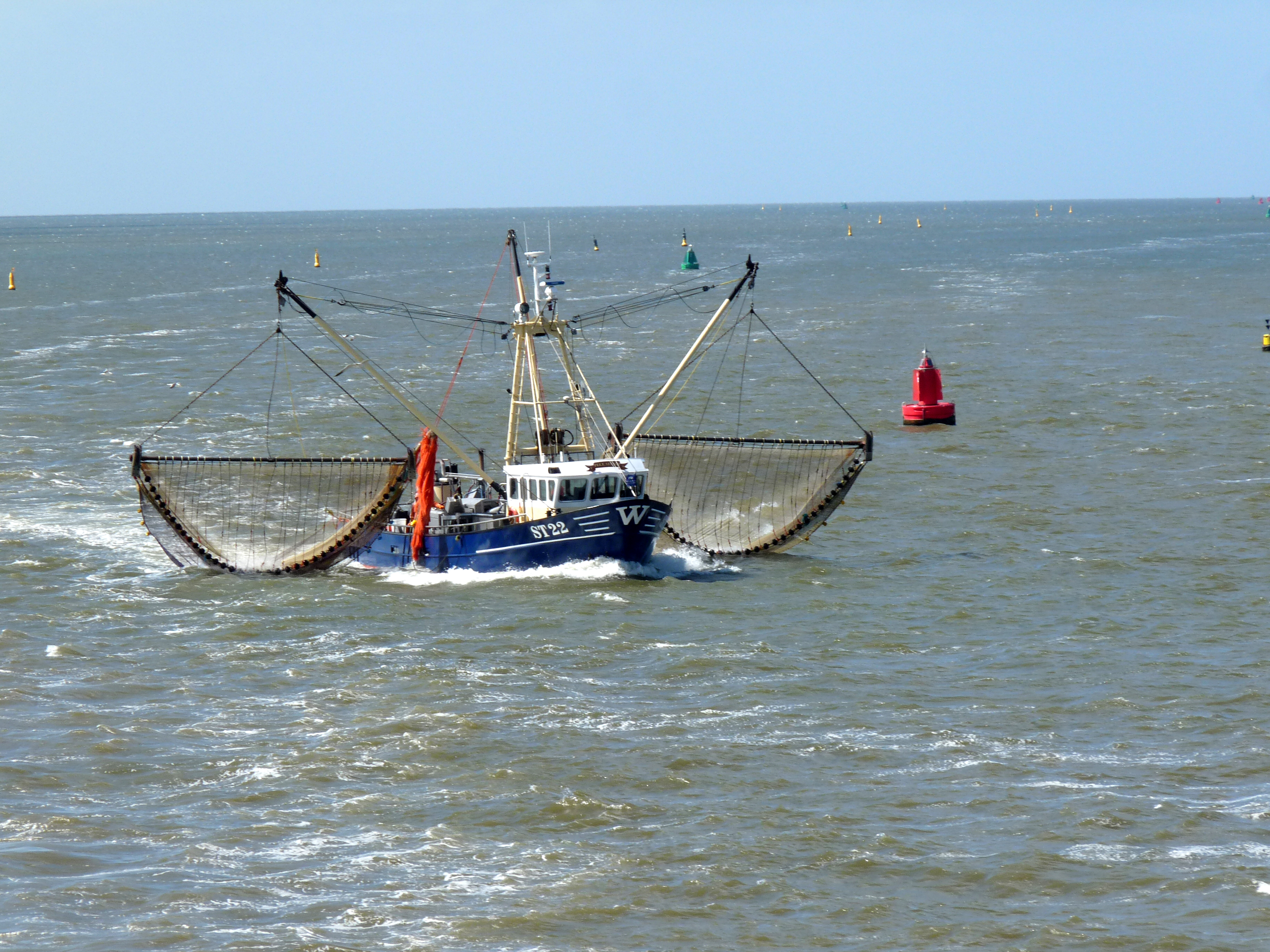
Fish stocks in a fishing ground are considered common-pool resources.

Common-pool resources are rival in consumption and non-excludable. An example is that of fisheries, which harvest fish from a shared common resource pool of fish stock. Fish caught by one group of fishermen are no longer accessible to another group, thus being rivalrous. However, oftentimes, due to an absence of well-defined property rights, it is difficult to restrict access to fishermen who may overfish.

==== Club goods ====
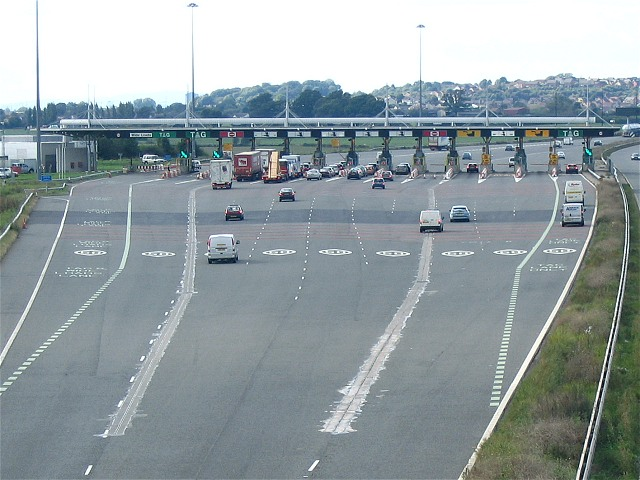
A noncongested toll road is an example of a club good. It is possible to exclude someone from using it by simply denying them access but it is not a rival good since one person's use of the road does not reduce its usefulness to others.

Club goods are excludable but not rivalrous in the consumption. That is, not everyone can use the good, but when one individual has claim to use it, they do not reduce the amount or the ability for others to consume the good. By joining a specific club or organization we can obtain club goods; As a result, some people are excluded because they are not members.

Examples in addition to the ones in the matrix are cable television, golf courses, and any merchandise provided to club members. A large television service provider would already have infrastructure in place which would allow for the addition of new customers without infringing on existing customers viewing abilities. This would also mean that marginal cost would be close to zero, which satisfies the criteria for a good to be considered non-rival. However, access to cable TV services is only available to consumers willing to pay the price, demonstrating the excludability aspect.

Economists set these categories for these goods and their impact on consumers. The government is usually responsible for public goods and common goods, and enterprises are generally responsible for the production of private and club goods, although this is not always the case.

=== History of the fourfold model of goods ===
In 1977, Nobel winner Elinor Ostrom and her husband Vincent Ostrom proposed additional modifications to the existing classification of goods so to identify fundamental differences that affect the incentives facing individuals. Their definitions are presented on the matrix.

Elinor Ostrom proposed additional modifications to the classification of goods to identify fundamental differences that affect the incentives facing individuals

1. Replacing the term "rivalry of consumption" with "subtractability of use".
2. Conceptualizing subtractability of use and excludability to vary from low to high rather than characterizing them as either present or absent.
3. Overtly adding a very important fourth type of good—common-pool resources—that shares the attribute of subtractability with private goods and difficulty of exclusion with public goods. Forests, water systems, fisheries, and the global atmosphere are all common-pool resources of immense importance for the survival of humans on this earth.
4. Changing the name of a "club" good to a "toll" good since goods that share these characteristics are provided by small scale public as well as private associations.

=== Expansion of fourfold model: anti-rivalrous ===
Consumption can be extended to include "Anti-rivalrous" consumption.

Types of goods based on consumption and excludability
| | Excludable | |
| | yes | no |
|---|---|---|
| Rivalrous | Private good | Common-pool good |
| Non-rivalrous | Club / toll good | Public good |
| Anti-rivalrous | "network" good, e.g., data on the internet; good that improves public health | "symbiotic" good, e.g., language |

=== Expansion of fourfold model: semi-excludable ===
The additional definition matrix shows the four common categories alongside providing some examples of fully excludable goods, Semi-excludable goods and fully non-excludeable goods. Semi-excludable goods can be considered goods or services that a mostly successful in excluding non-paying customer, but are still able to be consumed by non-paying consumers. An example of this is movies, books or video games that could be easily pirated and shared for free.

| | Fully excludable | Semi-excludable | Fully non-excludable |
|---|---|---|---|
| Rivalrous | Private goods food, clothing, cars, parking spaces | Piracy of copyrighted goods like movies, books, video games | Common-pool resources fish, timber, coal, free public transport |
| Non-rivalrous | Club goods cinemas, private parks, television, public transport | Sharing pay television or streaming subscriptions to more users than what is being paid for | Public goods free-to-air, air, national defense, free and open-source software |

== Trading of goods ==
Goods are capable of being physically delivered to a consumer. Goods that are economic intangibles can only be stored, delivered, and consumed by means of media.

Goods, both tangibles and intangibles, may involve the transfer of product ownership to the consumer. Services do not normally involve transfer of ownership of the service itself, but may involve transfer of ownership of goods developed or marketed by a service provider in the course of the service. For example, sale of storage related goods, which could consist of storage sheds, storage containers, storage buildings as tangibles or storage supplies such as boxes, bubble wrap, tape, bags and the like which are consumables, or distributing electricity among consumers is a service provided by an electric utility company. This service can only be experienced through the consumption of electrical energy, which is available in a variety of voltages and, in this case, is the economic goods produced by the electric utility company. While the service (namely, distribution of electrical energy) is a process that remains in its entirety in the ownership of the electric service provider, the goods (namely, electric energy) is the object of ownership transfer. The consumer becomes an electric energy owner by purchase and may use it for any lawful purposes just like any other goods.

== See also ==
- Bad (economics)
- Commodification
- Fast-moving consumer goods
- Final goods
- Finished goods
- Goods and services
- Intangible asset
- Intangible good
- List of economics topics
- Property
  - Tangible property
- Service (economics)
