= Daniel M. Hausman =

American philosopher (born 1947)

- Born: March 27, 1947; Chicago, Illinois, U.S.
- Occupation: Philosopher

Philosophical work
- Era: Contemporary philosophy
- Region: Western philosophy
- Institutions: University of Wisconsin–Madison, University of Maryland, College Park, Carnegie Mellon University

Daniel Murray Hausman (born March 27, 1947) is an American philosopher. His research has focused primarily on methodological, metaphysical, and ethical issues at the boundaries between economics and philosophy. He is currently Herbert A. Simon Professor Emeritus in the Department of Philosophy at the University of Wisconsin–Madison.

== Life and career ==
Hausman grew up in the Chicago suburbs. He attended Harvard College, first majoring in biochemistry, then changing to English literature and history (B.A., magna cum laude, 1969). From there, he went to New York University for a Teaching degree (M.A.T., 1971), then on to study moral sciences at Cambridge University (B.A., 1973) and philosophy at Columbia University (M.Phil., 1975; Ph.D., 1978).

Hausman taught philosophy at the University of Maryland, College Park and Carnegie Mellon University, before joining the faculty at Wisconsin in 1988.

Hausman was a founding co-editor (with Michael McPherson) of the journal Economics and Philosophy, which he co-edited for ten years from 1985. He has written or edited seven books and some 130 published papers. He is currently working on a book on preferences and on related questions concerning the measurement of health. Along with Alexander Rosenberg, he is a philosophical critic of economics.

He was elected a Fellow of the American Academy of Arts and Sciences in 2009.

== Selected publications ==
- Daniel M. Hausman, 1981. Capital, Profits, and Prices: An Essay in the Philosophy of Economics, Columbia. Chapter links (press clockwise-arrow and + buttons).
- _____, 1989. "Economic Methodology in a Nutshell," Journal of Economic Perspectives, 3(2), pp. 115-27.
- _____, 1992a. Essays on Philosophy and Economic Methodology. Description, ch. 1 link. Scroll to chapter-preview links.
- _____, 1992b. The Inexact and Separate Science of Economics. Description, to ch. 1 link, preview, and review extracts
- _____, 1997. "Why Does Evidence Matter So Little to Economic Theory?" in Structures and Norms in Science, Maria L.D. Chiara et al., ed., pp. 395-407.
- _____, 1998. Causal Asymmetries, Cambridge. Description and chapter-preview links.
- _____, 2001. "Economics: Philosophy of," International Encyclopedia of the Social & Behavioral Sciences, v. 6, pp. 4159–65. Abstract.
- _____, 2001. "Explanation and Diagnosis in Economics," Revue Internationale De Philosophie, 55, pp. 311–26.
- _____, 2003. "Philosophy of Economics," Stanford Encyclopedia of Philosophy
- _____, [1984] 2007. The Philosophy of Economics: An Anthology, 3rd ed. Cambridge. Description & scroll to chapter-preview links.
- _____, 2008. "Fairness and Social Norms," Philosophy of Science, 75(5), pp. 850–860. Abstract.
- _____, 2009a. "Equality of Autonomy," Ethics, 119(4), p p. 742–756.
- _____, 2009b. "Benevolence, Justice, Well-Being and the Health Gradient," Public Health Ethics, 2(3), pp. 235–243. Abstract.
- Daniel M. Hausman and Michael S. McPherson, [1994] 2006. Economic Analysis, Moral Philosophy, and Public Policy, 2nd ed. Cambridge. ISBN 0-521-55850-6 Description and contents-preview link. 2008 Review.
- _____, 2009. "Preference Satisfaction and Welfare Economics," Economics and Philosophy, 25 (1):1-25. Abstract.
- Daniel M. Hausman and Brynn Welch, 2010. "Debate: To Nudge or Not to Nudge," Journal of Political Philosophy, 18(1), pp. 123-136 (close Pages tab).

== Awards ==
- May 23, 2015 - A day-long Conference was held to honor the work of Daniel M. Hausman by the Philosophy Department of the University of Wisconsin.
- June 6, 2016 - Hausman received the Philosopher's Stone at the University of Bayreuth.

== See also ==
- Philosophy and economics
- Economic methodology
- Positive and normative economics
