= Lawrence A. Boland =

Canadian economist

Lawrence Arthur Boland

Academic background
- Influences: Karl Popper

Academic work
- Discipline: Methodology
- School or tradition: Economic Methodology
- Website: Information at IDEAS / RePEc

Lawrence Arthur Boland is a professor of economics at Simon Fraser University.

Boland is critical of the neoclassical research program. He has attempted to draw out the unstated assumptions of neoclassical economics and submit them to methodological scrutiny. His key criticisms of traditional economics center on the problem of induction, methodological individualism, and the acquisition of knowledge.

== Published work ==
- The Foundations of Economic Method (1982), London: Geo. Allen & Unwin
- Methodology for a New Microeconomics: The Critical Foundations (1986/87), Boston: Allen & Unwin
- The Methodology of Economic Model Building: Methodology after Samuelson (1989/91), London: Routledge, ISBN 0-415-00014-9.
- The Principles of Economics: Some Lies my Teachers Told Me (1992), London: Routledge, ISBN 0-415-13208-8.
- Critical Economic Methodology: A Personal Odyssey (1997), London: Routledge, ISBN 0-415-13607-5.
- The Foundations of Economic Method: A Popperian Perspective (2003), London: Routledge, ISBN 0-415-26774-9.
- Model building in economics : its purposes and limitations (2014), New York: Cambridge University Press, ISBN 9781107032941
