= Richard Robbins (artist) =

British artist (1927–2009)

- Born: 12 July 1927; Hampstead Garden Suburb, London, England
- Died: 28 July 2009 (aged 82)

Richard Robbins (12 July 1927 – 28 July 2009) was a British artist, sculptor and art teacher, who ended his career as Head of Fine Art at Middlesex University.

== Early life ==
Robbins was born in Hampstead Garden Suburb, London, in 1927. His parents were the economist Lionel Robbins (1898–1984) and his wife Iris (née Gardiner) (1896–1997). Robbins was born on the day that his father was elected a Fellow of New College, Oxford. His father became a life peer in 1958, rendering Robbins The Hon, which was a title he loathed and never used. He had an older sister, Anne, who would go on to marry the economist and journalist Christopher Johnson.

He attended King Alfred and University College Schools in London and, during World War II, New College School in Oxford and Dauntsey's School in Wiltshire. He was sent to Dauntsey's, known for its art teaching, having expressed a view at the age of seven that “I want to be a painter”.

== Military ==
Just after the end of the War in 1945, at 18 Robbins joined the Royal Artillery's 21st Field Training Regiment, then stationed in Venice. Bored with his duties and rejected for a Commission, Robbins left the Army in 1948. His time in Venice, however, did provide him with an opportunity to study Venetian art.

== Education ==
On being demobbed, Robbins went up to New College, Oxford where he read English under John Bayley, but without enthusiasm, and was awarded a Fourth, of which he was very proud. After Oxford he studied painting at Goldsmiths' College in London, the Ruskin School of Art and the Slade School of Fine Art.

== Career ==
After the Slade, Robbins combined making his own art with a career in teaching, first at Belmont, then at Camberwell College of Arts and finally at the Hornsey College of Art (subsequently Middlesex Polytechnic then Middlesex University). He spent 33 years at Hornsey and its successors, becoming Head of Painting in 1984 and Head of Fine Art in 1990. He retired in 1993, at which point he was made professor emeritus.

Robbins was a prolific painter and sculptor, both very interested in human form and in nature, particularly the Hampstead Ponds and Lyme Regis. The London School of Economics and the University of Stirling each hold bronzes of Robbins's bust of his father, who was respectively Professor of Economics and the first Chancellor. There is a self-portrait (1960) in the Ruth Borchard collection of self-portraits. Works are also held by New College, Oxford, University of Stirling, Highgate Literary & Scientific Institution, Lyme Regis Museum, the University of Middlesex, and the Whittington Hospital.

In 2004 he was made an Honorary Member of the Royal Society of British Artists. The Open College of the Arts (the distance-learning partner of the University for the Creative Arts) launched a Richard Robbins Award in his memory in 2011.

== Personal life ==
Robbins married Wendy Dobbs in 1952; the marriage ended in divorce. There were two sons: William, who predeceased Robbins, and Philip, also an artist. He married secondly, in 1961, Brenda Roberts, who had four sons of her own. Golf was a constant throughout Robbins's life. With a handicap of one he was much in demand as a golf partner for his regimental officers. He held an Oxford Blue in golf. For many years he was Captain of Hampstead Golf Club. Robbins died in 2009, aged 82, from leukaemia.
