= Scarcity development cycle =

The scarcity development cycle refers to the process all products and services undergo through continual use within the business cycle.

When new resources are created, demand rises; this causes prices to fall, otherwise known as Supply and demand. The high demand eventually leads to all the easily accessible reserves of the product being exhausted and resources become scarce. The scarcity raises prices which stimulates research and development. New technologies created as a result of this research lead to substitution, reuse and recycling of materials and the cycle then repeats.

== See also ==
- Supply and demand
