= Susan Howson =

Susan Howson may refer to:

- Susan Howson (economist) (born 1945), British economist
- Susan Howson (mathematician) (born 1973), British mathematician
