= Roger Backhouse (economist) =

British economist, economic historian and academic

Roger Edward Backhouse, FBA (born 19 January 1951) is a British economist, economic historian and academic. Since 1996, he has been professor of the history and philosophy of economics at the University of Birmingham.

Backhouse is an associate editor of the New Palgrave Dictionary of Economics (2008) and is also book review editor of the Economic Journal, an editor of the Journal of Economic Methodology and an associate editor of the Journal of the History of Economic Thought.

Backhouse is a noted scholar in the history of economics and economic methodology and has published in the economics of Keynes, disequilibrium macroeconomics, and the history of recent (post-1945) social science. In 2014 he was elected a Fellow of the British Academy, the United Kingdom's national academy for the humanities and social sciences.

His approach to the History of Economic Thought has been reviewed by E. Roy Weintraub.

Qualifications: B.Sc. in Economics and Economic History (University of Bristol); Ph.D. in Economics (University of Birmingham).

== Selected publications ==
- (1985) A History of Modern Economic Analysis, Oxford: Blackwell
- (1994) Economists and the Economy, 2nd ed., New Brunswick: Transaction
- (1997) Truth and Progress in Economic Knowledge, Cheltenham: Edward Elgar
- (1991) Applied UK Macroeconomics Blackwell Publishers
- (2001) Macroeconomics and the Real World, Volume 1: Econometric Techniques and Macroeconomics and Volume 2: Keynesian Economics, Unemployment, and Policy, edited by Roger E. Backhouse and Andrea Salanti. Oxford University Press.
- (2002) The Penguin History of Economics. Description & arrow-scrollable preview. ISBN 9780141937434, 0141937432
- (2010) The History of the Social Sciences since 1945. Cambridge University Press, edited by Roger E. Backhouse and Philippe Fontaine.
- (2010) The History of the Social Sciences since 1945, edited by Roger E. Backhouse and Philippe Fontaine. Cambridge University Press.
- (2017) Founder of Modern Economics: Paul A. Samuelson: Volume 1: Becoming Samuelson, 1915–1948. Description & arrow-scrollable preview. Oxford University Press. ISBN 978-0-19-066411-4
