= Private good =

Good which is excludable and rivalrous

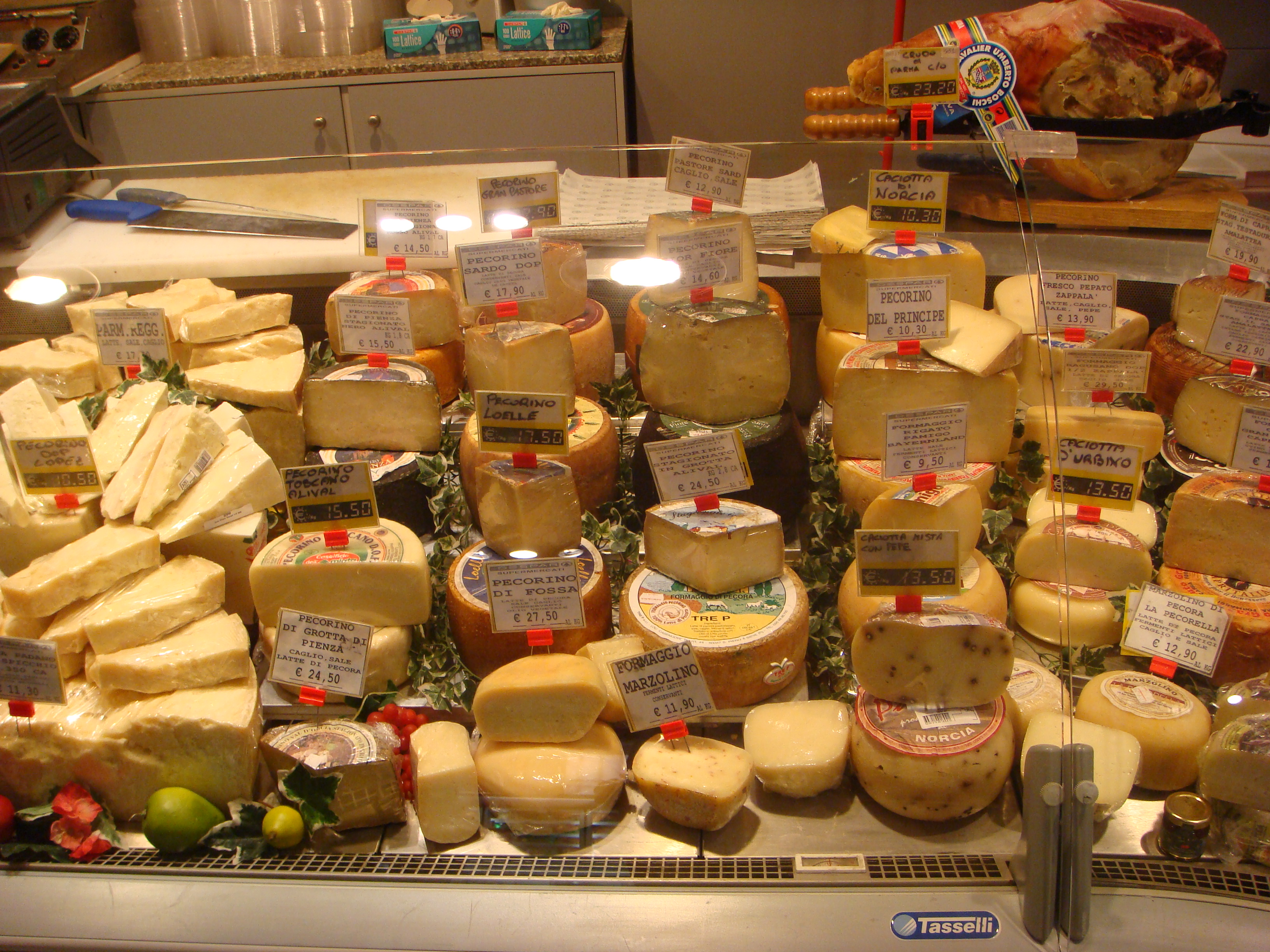
These cheeses are private goods. They are rivalrous, as the same piece of cheese can only be consumed once. They are also excludable, as it is possible for the store to prevent someone, such as a non-customer who will not pay the price, from consuming the cheese, as it is privately owned.

A private good is defined in economics as "an item that yields positive benefits to people" that is excludable, i.e. its owners can exercise private property rights, preventing those who have not paid for it from using the good or consuming its benefits; and rivalrous, i.e. consumption by one necessarily prevents that of another. A private good, as an economic resource is scarce, which can cause competition for it. The market demand curve for a private good is a horizontal summation of individual demand curves.

Unlike public goods, such as clean air or national defense, private goods are less likely to have the free rider problem, in which a person benefits from a public good without contributing towards it. Assuming a private good is valued positively by everyone, the efficiency of obtaining the good is obstructed by its rivalry; that is simultaneous consumption of a rivalrous good is theoretically impossible. The feasibility of obtaining the good is made difficult by its excludability, which means that people have to pay for it to enjoy its benefits.

One of the most common ways of looking at goods in the economy is by examining the level of competition in obtaining a given good, and the possibility of excluding its consumption; one cannot, for example, prevent another from enjoying a beautiful view in a public park, or clean air.

== Example of a private good ==
An example of the private good is bread: bread eaten by a given person cannot be consumed by another (rivalry), and it is easy for a baker to refuse to trade a loaf (exclusive).

To illustrate the horizontal summation characteristic, assume there are only two people in this economy and that:

- Person A will purchase: 0 loaves of bread at $4, 1 loaf of bread at $3, 2 loaves of bread at $2, and 3 loaves of bread at $1
- Person B will purchase: 0 loaves of bread at $6, 1 loaf of bread at $5, 2 loaves of bread at $4, 3 loaves of bread at $3, 4 loaves of bread at $2, and 5 loaves of bread at $1

As a result, a new market demand curve can be derived with the following results:

Price per loaf of bread	Loaves of bread		
	Person A	Person B	Total
$6	0	0	0
$5	0	1	1
$4	0	2	2
$3	1	3	4
$2	2	4	6
$1	3	5	8

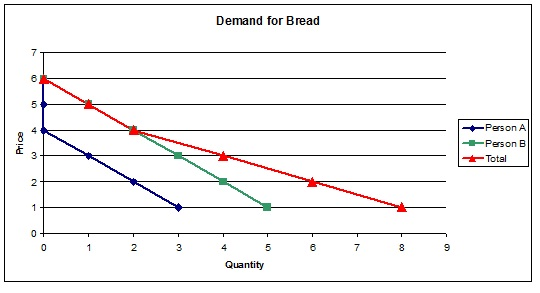
