= Epistemology of finance =

Study of mathematical models in finance

Epistemology of finance is a broad field of study that aims at providing a conceptual framework(s) for the interpretation of mathematical models in finance as well as the study of their possible limitations, in order to determine the epistemological standards according to which financial theory should be assessed against any associated empirical reality. A key problem is to what extent the combination of self-reference and adaption (reflexivity) undermine the stability, uniqueness, and usefulness of predictive models in finance and economics.

Within applied financial disciplines (which subsume financial economics, quantitative, and statistical finance) a single common assumption is pervasive; namely, that capital markets, being social systems, adhere sufficiently to epistemic norms. It has been argued that the use of incorrect epistemological assumptions is pervasive in financial economics and economics. These assumed epistemic norms carry with them a priori the necessity of unique, well-defined causal chains that can be meaningfully extracted from data. Both heterodox and mainstream economics retain the view that causality remains relevant as a formalism and that models remain sufficiently stable and unique (including under self-reference) and for this reason typically characterize empirical finance as science.

The alternative 'reflexive' view dates back to the 'Oedipus effect' of Popper, in control theory as the study of second-order cybernetics and also features in economics with Kauffman's Eigenform of markets. MacKenzie noted that the study of economics does more than simply describe, but rather shapes and changes the conditions of the economy, and society more broadly. While George Soros is commonly acknowledged as an ardent supporter of the reflexivity paradigm, Nobel laureates Herbert Simon and Franco Modigliani demonstrated an interest in and caution relating to reflexivity. Unsurprisingly, both Simon and Modigliani had a negative view on rational expectations. A third laureate - Robert Schiller - recently emphasised the importance of the study of reflexivity. That the implications of reflexivity have yet to be adequately assimilated in policy intervention, financial regulation or investments could, in part, explain why financial crises are often inherent and unavoidable within a positive framing of economics.

Subjects covered include the study of complexity and complexity theory, financial crisis as well as the epistemology of financial reporting.

It is closely related to philosophy and economics, financial market efficiency, rational expectation theory and the study of causality.

== See also ==
- Philosophy of accounting
- Philosophy and economics
- Christian Walter (in French)
