= Free good =

Concept in economics

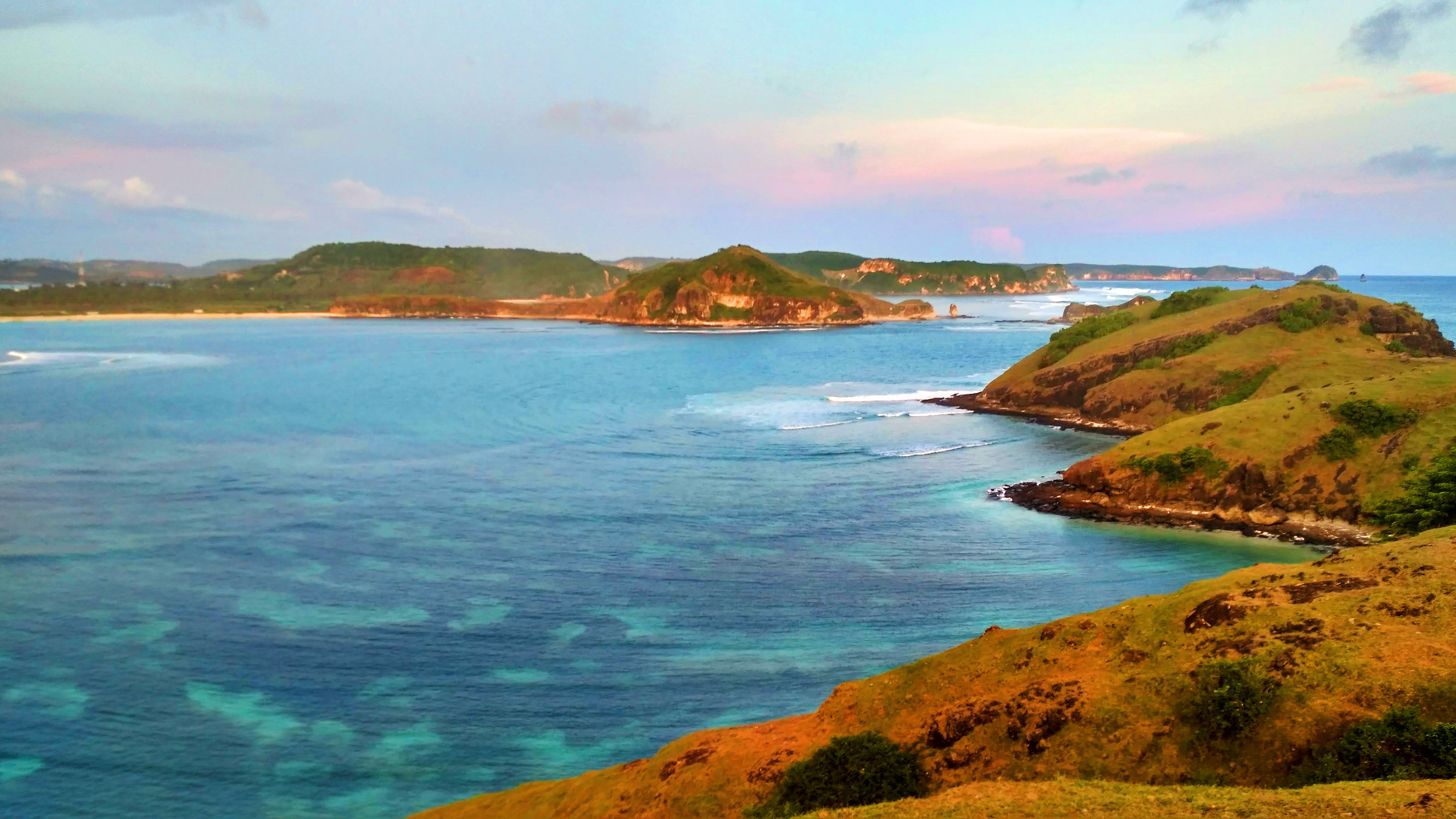
Seawater is an example of a free good because it is not scarce, and people can use it in great quantities without limitations.

In economics, a free good is a good that is not scarce, and therefore is available without limit. A free good is available in as great a quantity as desired with zero opportunity cost to society.

A good that is made available at zero price is not necessarily a free good. For example, a shop might give away its stock in its promotion, but producing these goods would still have required the use of scarce resources.

Examples of free goods are ideas and works that are reproducible at zero cost, or almost zero cost. For example, if someone invents a new device, many people could copy this invention, with no danger of this "resource" running out.

Earlier schools of economic thought stated that resources that are enough for everyone to have as much as they want are free goods. Examples in textbooks included seawater and air.

Intellectual property laws such as copyrights and patents have the effect of converting some intangible goods to scarce goods. Even though these works are free goods by definition and can be reproduced at minimal cost, the production of these works does require scarce resources, such as skilled labour. Thus these laws are used to give exclusive rights to the creators, in order to encourage resources to be appropriately allocated to these activities.

Futurists like Jeremy Rifkin theorize that advanced nanotechnology with the ability to turn any kind of material automatically into any other combination of equal mass will make all goods essentially free goods, since all raw materials and manufacturing time will become perfectly interchangeable.

== See also ==
- Open source
- Open data
- Artificial scarcity
