= Journal of Economic Methodology =

- Discipline: Economic methodology
- Language: English
- Edited by: D. Wade Hands, John B. Davis

Publication details
- History: 1994–present
- Publisher: Routledge on behalf of the International Network for Economic Method
- Frequency: Quarterly

Standard abbreviations
- ISO 4: J. Econ. Methodol.

Indexing
- ISSN: 1350-178X (print); 1469-9427 (web)
- OCLC no.: 807276862

Links
- Journal homepage; Online access; Online archive

The Journal of Economic Methodology is a peer-reviewed academic journal in the field of economic methodology, including methodological analyses of the theory and practice of economics, the implications of developments in both the theory and practice of economics, economics's philosophical foundations, the rhetoric of economics, the sociology of economics, and the economics of economics. It is the official journal of the International Network for Economic Method.
