= Christopher Louis McIntosh Johnson =

British journalist and economist

- Born: 12 June 1931; Thornton Heath, London
- Died: 14 December 2012 (aged 81)
- Education: Magdalen College, Oxford
- Occupations: Journalist, Economist

Christopher Louis McIntosh Johnson (12 June 1931 – 14 December 2012) was a journalist and economist.

== Family and education ==
Born in Thornton Heath, London, the son of Donald McIntosh Johnson, the Conservative MP, Christopher Johnson was educated at Winchester College and Magdalen College, Oxford, where he read philosophy, Politics and Economics. He married Anne Robbins, daughter of the economist Baron Robbins, in 1958 and had four children, including the artist and writer Wilma Johnson.

== Career ==
He completed his national service in the Royal Hampshire Regiment and the Education Corps before being placed on the reserve list. On 14 October 1950, while on the reserve list, he was appointed a Second lieutenant in the Royal Regiment of Artillery. Following national service he joined the Times Educational Supplement, moving to The Times in 1957 and becoming its Paris correspondent in 1959. He then joined the Financial Times, becoming managing editor and then director of business enterprises. From 1977 to 1991 he was chief economic adviser to Lloyds Bank and editor of the Lloyds Bank Review. He was also a specialist adviser to the House of Commons Treasury Select Committee, UK adviser to the Association for the Monetary Union of Europe, and chairman of the British section of the Franco-British Council.

== Works ==
Among his books is a well-regarded study of The Economy Under Mrs Thatcher, 1979-1990 (Penguin Books, 1991).
