= Susan Howson (economist) =

British economist (born 1945)

- Born: Susan Kyle Howson; October 21, 1945 (age 80)

Academic background
- Education: University of Cambridge

Academic work
- Discipline: Economics, Economic history, History of economic thought
- Institutions: University of Toronto

Susan Kyle Howson (born October 21, 1945) is a British economist, currently professor emeritus of economics at the University of Toronto in Canada.

Born in London, Howson received her Ph.D. in economics from the University of Cambridge in 1975, as well as a B.A./M.Sc. from the London School of Economics in 1967/1969. After graduating, she worked as a research economist in the International Division of the Bank of England.

She is a scholar of macroeconomics and economic history, having written numerous articles and books on the topics. She is the author of a biography of the economist Lionel Robbins, as well as a four-volume series on the collected works of James Meade. She is the recipient of the T.S. Ashton Prize from the Economic History Society (1973) and the Connaught Senior Research Fellowships in the Social Sciences (2004, 2007). In 2019, she was named a distinguished fellow of the History of Economics Society.

Howson is an emeritus professor of economics at the University of Toronto and a fellow of Trinity College Toronto, Canada.

== Publications ==
- Susan Howson, Lionel Robbins, Cambridge University Press, Cambridge and New York, 2011.
- Susan Howson and Donald Winch, The Economic Advisory Council 1930-1939: A study in economic advice during depression and recovery, Cambridge University Press, Cambridge, 2008.
- Susan Howson, The Collected Papers of James Meade, Routledge, London, 2004.
- Susan Howson, "Money and Monetary Policy since 1945", in The Cambridge Economic History of Modern Britain, Vol. III Structural Change and Growth (edited by R. Floud and P. Johnson), Cambridge University Press, Cambridge, 2004, pp. 136–166.
- Susan Howson, Economic Science and Political Economy: Selected Articles of Lionel Robbins, Macmillan, London, 1997.
- Susan Howson, British Monetary Policy 1945-51, Oxford: Clarendon Press, 1993.
- Susan Howson and Donald Moggridge (eds.), The Wartime Diaries of Lionel Robbins and James Meade 1943-45, Macmillan, London, 1990.
- Susan Howson, Domestic Monetary Management in Britain, 1919-38, Cambridge University Press, Cambridge, 1975.
