= Scarcity =

Concept in economics

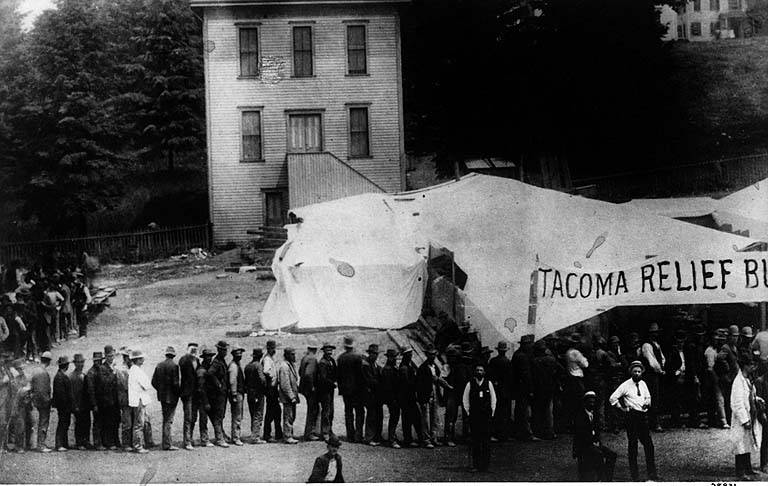
People queue up for soup and bread at relief tents in the aftermath of the Great Seattle Fire of June 6, 1889

In economics, scarcity refers to the basic fact of life that there exists only a finite amount of human and nonhuman resources which the best technical knowledge is capable of using to produce only limited maximum amounts of each economic good. If the conditions of scarcity did not exist and an "infinite amount of every good could be produced or human wants fully satisfied ... there would be no economic goods, i.e. goods that are relatively scarce..." Scarcity is the limited availability of a commodity, which may be in demand in the market or by the commons. Scarcity also includes an individual's lack of resources to buy commodities. The opposite of scarcity is abundance. Scarcity plays a key role in economic theory, and it is essential for a "proper definition of economics itself".

"The best example is perhaps Walras' definition of social wealth, i.e., economic goods. 'By social wealth', says Walras, 'I mean all things, material or immaterial (it does not matter which in this context), that are scarce, that is to say, on the one hand, useful to us and, on the other hand, only available to us in limited quantity'."

— Guido Montani (1987)

British economist Lionel Robbins is famous for his definition of economics which uses scarcity: "Economics is the science which studies human behaviour as a relationship between ends and scarce means which have alternative uses." Economic theory views absolute and relative scarcity as distinct concepts and is "quick in emphasizing that it is relative scarcity that defines economics." Current economic theory is derived in large part from the concept of relative scarcity which "states that goods are scarce because there are not enough resources to produce all the goods that people want to consume".

== Concept ==
Economic scarcity as defined by Samuelson in Economics, a "canonical textbook" of mainstream economic thought "refers to the basic fact of life that there exists only a finite amount of human and nonhuman resources which the best technical knowledge is capable of using to produce only limited maximum amounts of each economic good ... (outlined in the production possibility curve (PPC))." If the conditions of scarcity did not exist and an "infinite amount of every good could be produced or human wants fully satisfied ... there would be no economic goods, i.e. goods that are relatively scarce..."

This economic scarcity is not solely due to resource limits, but a consequence of human activity or social provisioning. There are two types of scarcity, relative and absolute scarcity.

=== Malthus and absolute scarcity ===
Thomas Robert Malthus laid "the theoretical foundation of the conventional wisdom that has dominated the debate, both scientifically and ideologically, on global hunger and famines for almost two centuries." In his 1798 book An Essay on the Principle of Population, Malthus observed that an increase in a nation's food production improved the well-being of the populace, but the improvement was temporary because it led to population growth, which in turn restored the original per capita production level. In other words, humans had a propensity to utilize abundance for population growth rather than for maintaining a high standard of living, a view that has become known as the "Malthusian trap" or the "Malthusian spectre". Populations had a tendency to grow until the lower class suffered hardship, want and greater susceptibility to famine and disease, a view that is sometimes referred to as a Malthusian catastrophe. Malthus wrote in opposition to the popular view in 18th-century Europe that saw society as improving and in principle as perfectible.

Schematic of the Malthusian catastrophe

Malthusianism is the idea that population growth is potentially exponential while the growth of the food supply or other resources is linear, which eventually reduces living standards to the point of triggering a population die off. It derives from the political and economic thought of Malthus, as laid out in his 1798 writings, An Essay on the Principle of Population. Malthus believed there were two types of ever-present "checks" that are continuously at work, limiting population growth based on food supply at any given time:

- preventive checks, such as moral restraints or legislative action — for example the choice by a private citizen to engage in abstinence and delay marriage until their finances become balanced, or restriction of legal marriage or parenting rights for persons deemed "deficient" or "unfit" by the government.
- positive checks, such as disease, starvation, and war, which lead to high rates of premature death — resulting in what is termed a Malthusian catastrophe. The adjacent diagram depicts the abstract point at which such an event would occur, in terms of the existing population and food supply: when the population reaches or exceeds the capacity of the shared supply, positive checks are forced to occur, restoring balance. (In reality, the situation would be significantly more nuanced due to complex regional and individual disparities around access to food, water, and other resources.) Positive checks by their nature are more "extreme and involuntary by nature".

Daoud argues that

(T)he strong drive for reproduction in relation to the weak expansion of food production possibilities will very rapidly result in a situation of scarcity and thus hunger. This fundamental relation between food requirements and the food production capacity is the ultimate check on population growth. -Daoud, 2010

There are two types of scarcity implicit in Malthusianism, namely scarcity of foods or "requirements" and objects that provide direct satisfaction of these food needs or "available quantities". These are absolute in nature and define economic concepts of scarcity, abundance, and sufficiency as follows:

- absolute sufficiency is the condition where human requirements in the way of food needs and available quantities of useful goods are equal.
- absolute scarcity is the condition where human requirements in the way of food needs are greater than the available quantities of useful goods.

Daoud citing Daly (1977) states that

"(A)bsolute scarcity . . . refers to the scarcity of resources in general, the scarcity of ultimate means. Absolute scarcity increases as growth in population and per-capital consumption push us ever closer to the carrying capacity of the biosphere. The concept presupposes that all economical substitutions among resources will be made (this is relative scarcity). While such substitutions will certainly mitigate the burden of absolute scarcity, they will not eliminate it nor prevent its eventual increase" -Daly 1977: 39

- absolute abundance is the condition where the available quantities of useful goods are greater than human requirements in the way of food needs.

=== Robbins and relative scarcity ===
Lionel Robbins was prominent member of the economics department at the London School of Economics. He is famous for the quote, "Humans want what they can't have." Robbins is noted as a free market economist, and for his definition of economics. The definition appears in the Essay by Robbins as:

"Economics is the science which studies human behaviour as a relationship between ends and scarce means which have alternative uses."

Robbins found that four conditions were necessary to support this definition:

- The decision-maker wants both more income and more income-earning assets.
- The decision-maker does not have the means to choose both. In this case, the means are not identified.
- The decision-maker can "augment" (Robbins) both their income and income-earning assets. In this case, implicitly, this is a limited ability, or the project stakeholder would not be subject to scarcity.
- The decision maker's desire for various constituent elements of income and income-earning assets are different. Robbins crucially makes the point later in his essay that this fourth condition can be restated as being "capable of being distinguished in order of importance, then behavior necessarily assumes the form of choice." Robbins argued that there had to be a hierarchy of needs to support these conditions.

Therefore, the decision-maker must exercise choice, i.e., "economize." Robbins argues that the "disposition of the ... (stakeholder's)... time and resources has a relationship to (their) system of wants." The definition is not classificatory in "pick[ing] out certain kinds of behavior" but rather analytical in "focus[ing] attention on a particular aspect of behavior, the form imposed by the influence of scarcity."

"(W)hen time and the means for achieving ends are limited and capable of alternative application, and the ends are capable of being distinguished in order of importance, the behaviour necessarily assumes the form of choice. Every act which involves time and scarce means for the achievement of one end involves the relinquishment of their use for the achievement of another. It has an economic aspect."

These are relative in nature and define economic concepts of scarcity, abundance, and sufficiency as follows:

- relative sufficiency is the condition where multiple, different human requirements and available quantities with alternative uses are equal.
- relative scarcity is the condition where multiple, different human requirements are greater than the available quantities with alternative uses.
- relative abundance is the condition where the available quantities of useful goods with alternative uses are greater than the multiple, different human requirements.

Economic theory views absolute and relative scarcity as distinct concepts and "...quick in emphasizing that it is relative scarcity that defines economics." Relative scarcity is the starting point for economics.

=== Samuelson and relative scarcity ===
Samuelson tied the notion of relative scarcity to that of economic goods when he observed that if the conditions of scarcity did not exist and an "infinite amount of every good could be produced or human wants fully satisfied ... there would be no economic goods, i.e. goods that are relatively scarce..." The basic economic fact is that this "limitation of the total resources capable of producing different (goods) makes necessary a choice between relatively scarce commodities."

=== Modern concepts of scarcity ===
Scarcity refers to a gap between limited resources and theoretically limitless wants. The notion of scarcity is that there is never enough (of something) to satisfy all conceivable human wants, even at advanced states of human technology. Scarcity involves making a sacrifice—giving something up, or making a trade-off—in order to obtain more of the scarce resource that is wanted.

The condition of scarcity in the real world necessitates competition for scarce resources, and competition occurs "when people strive to meet the criteria that are being used to determine who gets what". The price system, or market prices, are one way to allocate scarce resources. "If a society coordinates economic plans on the basis of willingness to pay money, members of that society will [strive to compete] to make money" If other criteria are used, we would expect to see competition in terms of those other criteria.

For example, although air is more important to us than gold, it is less scarce simply because the production cost of air is zero. Gold, on the other hand, has a high production cost. It has to be found and processed, both of which require a lot of resources. Additionally, scarcity implies that not all of society's goals can be pursued at the same time; trade-offs are made of one goal against others. In an influential 1932 essay, Lionel Robbins defined economics as "the science which studies human behavior as a relationship between ends and scarce means which have alternative uses". In cases of monopoly or monopsony an artificial scarcity can be created. Scarcity can also occur through stockpiling, either as an attempt to corner the market or for other reasons. Temporary scarcity can be caused by (and cause) panic buying.

== Scarce goods ==
A scarce good is a good that has more quantity demanded than quantity supplied at a price of $0. The term scarcity refers to the possible existence of conflict over the possession of a finite good. One can say that, for any scarce good, someone's ownership and control excludes someone else's control. Scarcity falls into three distinctive categories: demand-induced, supply-induced, and structural. Demand-induced scarcity happens when the demand of the resource increases and the supply stays the same. Supply-induced scarcity happens when a supply is very low in comparison to the demand. This happens mostly due to environmental degradation like deforestation and drought. Lastly, structural scarcity occurs when part of a population does not have equal access to resources due to political conflicts or location. This happens in Africa where desert countries do not have access to water. To get the water, they have to travel and make agreements with countries that have water resources. In some countries, political groups hold necessary resources hostage for concessions or money. Supply-induced and structural scarcity demands for resources cause the most conflict for a country.

== Nonscarce goods ==
On the opposite side of the coin, there are nonscarce goods. These goods do not need to be valueless, and some can even be indispensable for one's existence. As Frank Fetter explains in his Economic Principles: "Some things, even such as are indispensable to existence, may yet, because of their abundance, fail to be objects of desire and of choice. Such things are called free goods. They have no value in the sense in which the economist uses that term. Free goods are things which exist in superfluity; that is, in quantities sufficient not only to gratify but also to satisfy all the desires which may depend upon them". As compared with the scarce goods, nonscarce goods are the ones where there can be no contest over its ownership. The fact that someone is using something does not prevent anyone else from using it. For a good to be considered nonscarce, it can either have an infinite existence, no sense of possession, or it can be infinitely replicated.

== See also ==
- Non-renewable resources
- Artificial scarcity
- Economic shortage
- Energy crisis
- Paradox of value
- Post-scarcity economy
- Resource depletion
- Scarcity heuristic
- Trade-off

== Cited sources ==
- Robbins, Lionel C. (1932). An Essay on the Nature and Significance of Economic Science (PDF). London: Macmillan.
