= Teoría de Precios: Porqué está mal la Economía =

2010 publication

- Author: Jorge Del Villar
- Language: Spanish
- Genre: Essay
- Publisher: Cambridge Brickhouse Inc.
- Publication date: first edition (2010)
- Publication place: Mexico
- Pages: 141
- ISBN: 978-1-59835-271-9
- Preceded by: Cantos modernos: yo con Jesús

Teoría de Precios: Porqué está mal la Economía (Price Theory: Economics is Mistaken) is an economic essay written in textbook format by Mexican author Jorge Del Villar.

== Author's biographical notes ==
Jorge del Villar is a Mexican writer, economist, journalist and artist. El Heraldo, El Sol de México and Momento newspapers covered on July 6 and 7, 1986, the opening of an art exhibit of artists linked to San Luis Potosí State at the Casa de la Cultura de San Luis Potosí, unveiled by its then director Francisco Cossío, whose name was later used to rename the cultural center as Museo Francisco Cossio and by Raúl Gamboa Cantón, director of the Instituto Potosino de Bellas Artes. Jorge del Villar was only nine years old when his paintings were displayed in that exhibition. According to The Baltimore Sun, Del Villar’s involvement in his community dates back to his days at university. On November 2, 1997; Carroll County Times' front page covered a Mexican exhibit curated by the Mexican student, interested in sharing his heritage with Maryland's community. Jorge graduated summa cum laude from Western Maryland with a degree in economics. He also graduated from SOGEM School of Writers, where he had great professors, including Vicente Leñero, Hugo Arguelles, Emmanuel Carballo, Victor Huerta, Monica Lavin and Veronica Murguia From 2000 to 2002, del Villar served as advisor to Mexican Foreign Minister Jorge Castañeda Gutman. From his column in El Universal, which he wrote from 2004 to 2007, del Villar promoted legislative changes to advance the rights of Mexico City’s citizens. He also managed a five hundred cattle limited liability rural production company. The author is the son of Samuel I. Del Villar, a graduate of Harvard Law School and founder of the Mexican left wing party PRD and great-grandson of Manuel Gamio, considered father of Anthropology in Mexico. Del Villar hosted a radio talk show, "Caras de la Ciudad," which held discussions with public guests, including cabinet rank government officials, representatives and specialists. The program unveiled matters of national relevance, such as exposing left wing members of Congress who opposed legislation to promote gay rights. "Caras de la Ciudad" was transmitted by MVS Radio, an international broadcaster where CNN conductor Carmen Aristegui, worked.

Del Villar has received the Reconocimiento INEGI, given by the autonomous Mexican National Institute of Statistics and Geography, INEGI, for serving society by professionally broadcasting unbiased statistical data and for his contribution as a journalist. Eduardo Sojo Garza-Aldape, INEGI's president, gave the award, which has also been granted, to other renowned writers and journalists such as Mario Luis Fuentes and Karla Iberia Sánchez.

For his expertise in political affairs from an academic perspective, Jorge del Villar was hired to conduct the TV show "Habla de Frente" which stood out by being broadcast by two TV channels simultaneously, Canal Once and Canal Judicial and sponsored by Mexico's Federal Electoral Tribunal. According to its former president, Magistrate José Alejandro Luna Ramos, the purpose of the program was to promote a democratic culture, while for Enriqueta Cabrera y Cuarón, former director of Canal Once, this program was fundamental towards creating a sense of citizenship in Mexico.

In 2016, del Villar conducted, also in Canal Once the TV show, "A Favor y en Contra" where most respected scholars and popular politicians debated about controversial issues.

The Mexican author has written in most respected and popular daily newspapers in Mexico, including La Jornada; Reforma; during four years, he was columnist for El Universal, and now he is columnist for El Influyente. In October 2016, Jorge exhibited the artwork, "The Future of Modern Economic Theory" at prestigious JLS Gallery in Mexico City. With this art piece, which was created six months before the 2016 U.S. presidential elections, del Villar was one of the precursors of a movement known as "Trump Art". The artwork of about 6 ft wide and long, consists of the face of Donald Trump with a handwriting message forming a spiral in "Mexican pink" acrylic, reminiscent of Diego Rivera and Frida Kahlo scriptures on top of several paintings. The text invites anyone to change towards a more humane lifestyle and predicts an inevitable change of social and economic paradigms. The exhibit was covered by anchors Adriana Perez Canedo and Javier Solorzano and by La Jornada and El Sol de México.

== Theme ==
Teoría de Precios: Porqué está mal la Economía questions the fundamentals of economic theory. According to Del Villar, while all the components of the market have changed, including economic goods, producers and consumers, the basic theoretical principles have remained the same since 1776 when Adam Smith published An Inquiry into the Nature and Causes of the Wealth of Nations. Del Villar believes that economic theory, including the Law of Demand, the Law of Supply, and the explanations given to price determination, lacks of scientific rigor. He also considers that the discipline does not provide veridical explanations to the way consumers and producers behave in the real world.

Del Villar proposes an integral revision of the fundamental principles upon which economic theory is built and suggests that other disciplines, like anthropology, should be included in such a process.

== Reception ==
Mexican media has taken interest in Teoría de Precios: Porqué está mal la Economía and has related common problems in the Mexican economy with the ideas in the book. Del Villar has been interviewed on Televisa's program "Primero Noticias" and on Radio Formula, Mexico´s largest broadcast house. The book has received reviews in journals and periodicals, such as CEIDAS' journal, México Social, Excélsior newspaper, MVS Comunicaciones, and Tiempo Libre magazine may be picked up for a second printing.
