= Economic methodology =

Subfield of economics

Economic methodology is the study of methods, especially the scientific method, in relation to economics, including principles underlying economic reasoning. In contemporary English, 'methodology' may reference theoretical or systematic aspects of a method (or several methods). Philosophy and economics also takes up methodology at the intersection of the two subjects.

== Scope ==
General methodological issues include similarities and contrasts to the natural sciences and to other social sciences and, in particular, to:

- the definition of economics
- the scope of economics as defined by its methods
- fundamental principles and operational significance of economic theory
- methodological individualism versus holism in economics
- the role of simplifying assumptions such as rational choice and profit maximizing in explaining or predicting phenomena
- descriptive/positive, prescriptive/normative, and applied uses of theory
- the scientific status and expanding domain of economics
- issues critical to the practice and progress of econometrics
- the balance of empirical and philosophical approaches
- the role of experiments in economics
- the role of mathematics and mathematical economics in economics
- the writing and rhetoric of economics
- the relation between theory, observation, application, and methodology in contemporary economics.

Economic methodology has gone from periodic reflections of economists on method to a distinct research field in economics since the 1970s. In one direction, it has expanded to the boundaries of philosophy, including the relation of economics to the philosophy of science and the theory of knowledge. In another direction of philosophy and economics, additional subjects are treated including decision theory and ethics.

== See also ==
- Economic systems
- Methodology of econometrics
- Model (economics)
