= Definitions of economics =

Various definitions of economics have been proposed, including attempts to define precisely "what economists do".

== Etymology ==
The term economics was originally known as "political economy". This term evolved from the French Mercantilist usage of économie politique, which expanded the notion of economy from the ancient Greek concept of household management to the national level, as the public administration of state affairs.

== Definitions ==
=== James Steuart ===
In 1770, Scottish economist Sir James Steuart wrote An Inquiry into the Principles of Political Economy, the first book in English with "political economy" in its title, describing it as:

Economy in general [is] the art of providing for all the wants of a family, so the science of political economy seeks to secure a certain fund of subsistence for all the inhabitants, to obviate every circumstance which may render it precarious; to provide everything necessary for supplying the wants of the society, and to employ the inhabitants[...] in such manners naturally to create reciprocal relations and dependencies between them, so as to supply one another with reciprocal wants.

The title page lists subjects including "population, agriculture, trade, industry, money, coins, interest, circulation, banks, exchange, public credit, and taxes".

=== Say, Carlyle, Mill, and Menger ===
In 1803, French economist Jean-Baptiste Say distinguished the subject from its public policy uses, defining it as the science of the production, distribution, and consumption of wealth. On the satirical side, Thomas Carlyle (1849) coined 'the dismal science' as an epithet for classical economics, a term often linked to the pessimistic analysis of Malthus (1798). English philosopher John Stuart Mill (1844) defined the subject in a social context as:

The science which traces the laws of such of the phenomena of society as arise from the combined operations of mankind for the production of wealth, in so far as those phenomena are not modified by the pursuit of any other object.

The shift from the social to the individual level appears within the main works of the Marginal Revolution. Carl Menger's 1871 definition reflects the focus on the economizing man:

For economic theory is concerned, not with practical rules for economic activity, but with the conditions under which men engage in provident activity directed to the satisfaction of their needs.

=== William Stanley Jevons ===
William Stanley Jevons, another influential author of the Marginal Revolution, in 1871 defined economics as highlighting the hedonic and quantitative aspects of the science:

In this work I have attempted to treat Economy as a Calculus of Pleasure and Pain, and have sketched out, almost irrespective of previous opinions, the form which the science, as it seems to me, must ultimately take. I have long thought that as it deals throughout with quantities, it must be a mathematical science in matter if not in language.

=== Alfred Marshall ===
Alfred Marshall provides a still widely cited definition in his textbook Principles of Economics (1890) that extends analysis beyond wealth and from the societal to the microeconomic level, creating a certain synthesis of the views of those still more sympathetic with the classical political economy (with social wealth focus) and those early adopters of the views expressed in the Marginal Revolution (with individual needs focus). His inclusion of the expression wellbeing was also very significant to the discussion on the nature of economics:

Political Economy or Economics is a study of mankind in the ordinary business of life; it examines that part of individual and social action which is most closely connected with the attainment and with the use of the material requisites of well-being. Thus it is on the one side a study of wealth; and on the other, and more important side, a part of the study of man.

=== Lionel Robbins ===
Lionel Robbins (1932) developed implications of what has been termed "perhaps the most commonly accepted current definition of the subject":

Economics is a science which studies human behaviour as a relationship between ends and scarce means which have alternative uses.

Robbins describes the definition as not classificatory in "pick[ing] out certain kinds of behaviour" but rather analytical in "focus[ing] attention on a particular aspect of behaviour, the form imposed by the influence of scarcity".

Subsequent authors have sometimes criticized the definition as overly broad, in failing to limit its subject matter to analysis of markets. From the 1960s, these comments abated as the economic theory of maximizing behaviour and rational-choice modelling expanded the domain of the subject to areas previously treated in other fields. Another common criticism concerns scarcity not accounting for the macroeconomics of high unemployment.

=== Gary Becker ===
Gary Becker, a contributor to the expansion of economics into new areas, describes the approach he favours as "combining the assumptions of maximizing behaviour, stable preferences, and market equilibrium, used relentlessly and unflinchingly". One commentary characterizes the remark as making economics an approach rather than a subject matter, but with great specificity as to the "choice process and the type of social interaction that such analysis involves".

=== John Neville Keynes ===
English economist John Neville Keynes in the early 20th century regarded the discussion leading up to the definition of economics more important than the definition itself. He believed this discussion could reveal the field's scope, direction, and challenges.

A recent review of economics definitions from textbooks and other sources included describing the subject as the study of:

- the "economy"
- the coordination process
- the effects of scarcity
- the science of choice
- human behaviour
- human beings as to how they coordinate wants and desires, given the decision-making mechanisms, social customs, and political realities of society

It concludes that the lack of agreement need not affect the subject matter that the texts treat. Among economists more generally, it argues that a particular definition presented may reflect the direction toward which the author believes economics is evolving, or should evolve.

== Further references ==
- Bye, Raymond T. (1939) "The Scope and Definition of Economics", Journal of Political Economy, 47(5), pp. 623–647.
- Coase, Ronald H. (1978). "Economics and Contiguous Disciplines", Journal of Legal Studies, 7(2), pp. 201–211.
- Dow, Sheila C. (2002) Economic Methodology: An Inquiry, Oxford University Press. Description and review.
