= Welfare definition of economics =

Attempt to redefine economics

The welfare definition of economics is an attempt by Alfred Marshall, a pioneer of neoclassical economics, to redefine his field of study. This definition expands the field of economic science to a larger study of humanity. Specifically, Marshall's view is that economics studies all the actions that people take in order to achieve economic welfare. In the words of Marshall, "man earns money to get material welfare." Others since Marshall have described his remark as the "welfare definition" of economics. This definition enlarged the scope of economic science by emphasizing the study of wealth and humanity together, rather than wealth alone. In his widely read textbook, Principles of Economics, published in 1890, Marshall defines economics as follows:

Political Economy or Economics is a study of mankind in the ordinary business of life; it examines that part of individual and social action which is most closely connected with the attainment and with the use of material requisites of well-being.

== Functions ==
The following are the implications of this definition:

1. Economics is a study of humankind.
2. Human life has several aspects: social, religious, economic and political—but economics is concerned only with the economic aspect of life.
3. Promotion of welfare is the ultimate goal, but the term welfare is used in a narrow sense to meet material welfare only.

According to Edwin Cannan, "the aim of political economy or Economics is the explanation of the general causes on which the material welfare of human beings depend".

Marshall clearly explains that economic activity is different from other activity. For example,

If a student visits a friend who is ill, it is a social activity,
If a person give his vote in an election, it is a political activity.
If a person goes to church/temple it is a religious activity.

Marshall defines economic activity as separate from the above activities. A farmer who toils in the field, or a worker on an assembly, are performing an economic activity: they work to increase their material welfare (primarily by earning money). Money buys goods or services that satisfy wants. In other words, economics deals with effort, wants, and the satisfaction of those wants.

== Impact on economics ==
Followers in the neoclassical tradition, such as William Beveridge and Arthur Pigou have continued to define economics in terms of material economic welfare. According to Pigou, "the range of enquiry becomes restricted to that part of social welfare that can be brought directly or indirectly into relation with the measuring rod of money".

== Criticism ==
Marshall’s definition has been criticized by more recent economists, including Lionel Robbins. Robbins' criticisms include:

(1) Narrows down the scope of economics. Marshall distinguishes between material and non-material welfare, and confines economics to the study of material welfare. Robbins feels that economists should pay attention to material welfare. There are things that are "non-material" but they promote human welfare. Robbins cites “the services of doctors, lawyers, teachers, dancers, engineers, professors". These goods "satisfy our wants and are scarce in supply”. Some economists feel that Marshall's definition of "material" includes both goods and services, and that Robbins is either misreading Marshall's text, or creating a straw man argument.

(2) Assumes equivalency between welfare and economic activity. For Robbins, there are economic activities which do not promote human welfare. For example, the sale of cocaine or heroin. Here Robbins says, “Why talk of welfare at all? Why not throw away the mask altogether”.

(3) It is a vague concept. According to Robbins, “welfare” is a vague concept to use to define economics because it is subjective. Economics is a quantitative science; but welfare cannot be quantitatively measured, and two persons cannot agree on what creates or improves welfare.

(4) It involves value judgement. Finally the word “welfare” in Marshall’s definition brings economics to the realm of ethics. Robbins would prefer that economics remain neutral in assessing the results of economic transactions.

== Economic welfare ==
Broadly, economic welfare is the level of prosperity and standard of living of either an individual or a group of persons. In the field of economics, it specifically refers to utility gained through the achievement of material goods and services. In other words, it refers to that part of social welfare that can be fulfilled through economic activity.

According to Roefie Hueting, welfare is dependent on factors like employment, income distribution, labour conditions, leisure time, production and the scarce possible uses of the environmental functions.

Economic welfare is measured in different ways, depending on the preferences of those measuring it. Factors used to measure the economic welfare of a population, include: GDP, literacy, access to health care, and assessments of environmental quality.

== See also ==
- Welfare economics
