= Lionel Robbins =

British economist (1898–1984)

The Right Honourable The Lord Robbins CH CB FBA
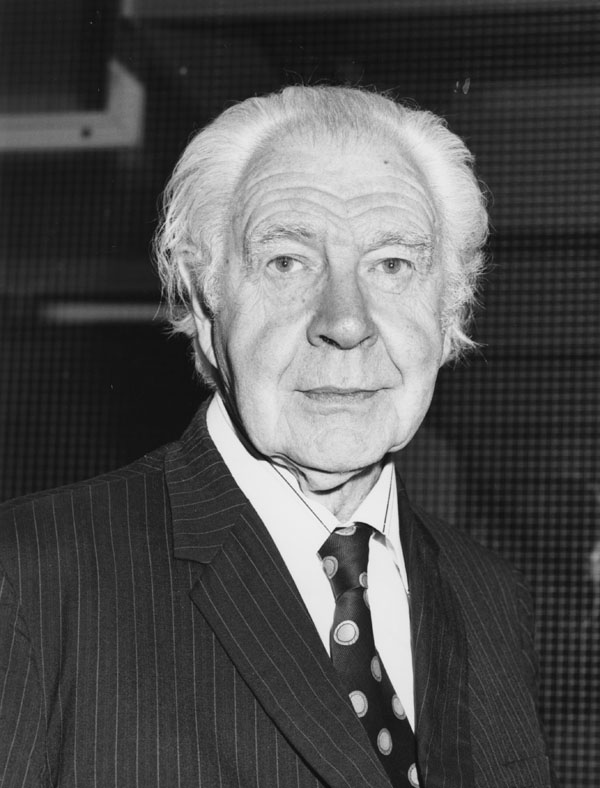
- Robbins at the opening of the Lionel Robbins building at the LSE, 27 July 1978
- Born: 22 November 1898; Sipson, Middlesex, England
- Died: 15 May 1984 (aged 85); London, England

Academic background
- Education: University College London, London School of Economics
- Doctoral advisor: Edwin Cannan
- Influences: William Stanley Jevons, Philip Wicksteed, Ludwig von Mises, Nathan Isaacs

Academic work
- School or tradition: Neoclassical economics Austrian school of economics
- Institutions: London School of Economics
- Doctoral students: Nicholas Kaldor; Amiya Kumar Dasgupta; Abba P. Lerner; William Baumol; Frank Hahn
- Notable ideas: Robbins Report

Lionel Charles Robbins, Baron Robbins, CH, CB, FBA (22 November 1898 – 15 May 1984) was a British economist, and prominent member of the economics department at the London School of Economics (LSE). He is known for his leadership at LSE, his proposed definition of economics, and for his instrumental efforts in shifting Anglo-Saxon economics from its Marshallian direction. He is famous for the quote, "Humans want what they can't have."

== Early life ==
Robbins was born in Sipson, west of London, the son of Rowland Richard Robbins (1872–1960), known as Dick, and his wife Rosa Marion Harris; his father was a farmer, a member of Middlesex County Council who later served as the president of the National Farmers' Union, and the family was Strict Baptist. His sister Caroline became a noted Professor of History at Bryn Mawr College.

Robbins was educated at home, at Hounslow College (a preparatory school) and at Southall County School. He went to University College London in October 1915, beginning an Arts degree and attending lectures by W. P. Ker, the medievalist Francis Charles Montague, and A. F. Pollard. Wishing to serve in World War I, he began training in early 1916 at Topsham, Devon. He was in the Royal Field Artillery as an officer from August 1916 to 1918, when he was wounded by a sniper on 12 April in the Battle of the Lys and returned home with the rank of lieutenant.

During the war Robbins became interested in guild socialism, reading in G. D. H. Cole and by personal contact with Reginald Lawson, a connection from the Harris side of the family. Through Clive Gardiner, an artist commissioned by Dick Robbins in 1917 to paint his son's portrait, Robbins met first Alfred George Gardiner, Clive's father, and then his ally the activist James Joseph Mallon. After his convalescence and 1919 demobilisation from the army, Robbins was employed for about a year by the Labour Campaign for the Nationalization of the Drink Trade, a position found with Mallon's help. The campaign was an offshoot of the State Management Scheme set up during the war, and Robbins worked in Mecklenburgh Square, London for Mallon and Arthur Greenwood.

In 1920, Robbins resumed studies at the London School of Economics (LSE), where he was taught by Harold Laski, Edwin Cannan and Hugh Dalton. He graduated B.Sc. (Econ) in 1923 with first class honours. Dalton's biographer Ben Pimlott wrote that Robbins was the "most promising student of his generation at the L.S.E."

== Academic ==
After graduation, Robbins found a six-month position as a researcher for William Beveridge, via Dalton. He had applied successfully to New College, Oxford for a fellowship in economics, with references from Alfred George Gardiner (shortly to be his father-in-law), Theodore Gregory and Graham Wallas. It was a one-year lecturing position, and he returned to LSE in 1925, again with Dalton's backing, as assistant lecturer, shortly becoming lecturer.

In 1927, Robbins returned to New College as a Fellow, but continued to teach at LSE, lecturing on a weekly basis. After the death in 1929 of Allyn Abbott Young, Professor of Economics at LSE, Robbins replaced him in the chair, and moved with his wife to Hampstead Garden Suburb. During the 1930s he built up the economics department, hiring Friedrich von Hayek, John Hicks and Nicholas Kaldor. He came under a "strong personal influence" of both Hayek and Hayek's mentor Ludwig von Mises.

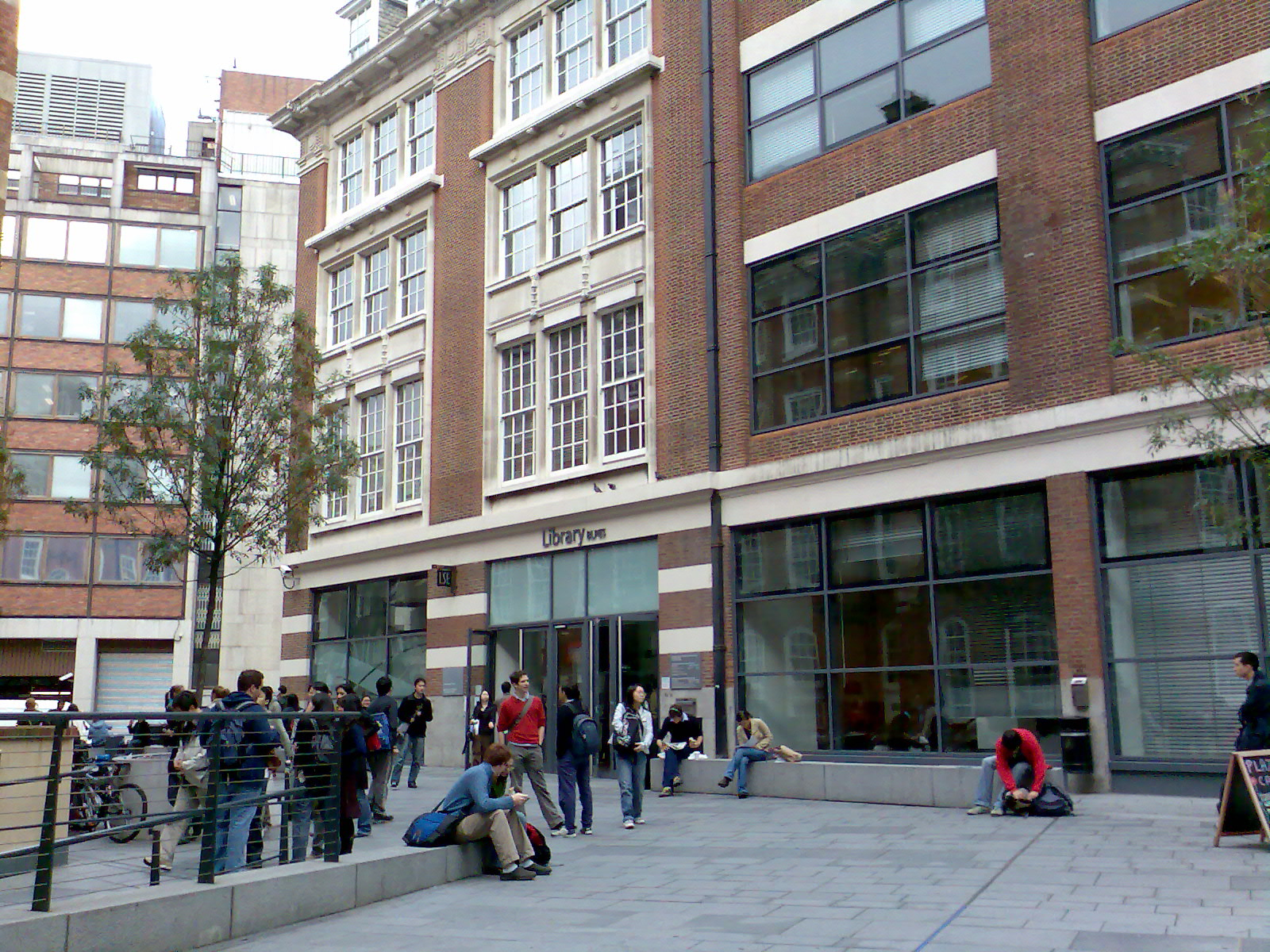
The Lionel Robbins Building at the London School of Economics

== Contra Keynes ==
Robbins clashed with John Maynard Keynes in early October 1930, on the Committee of Economists of the Second MacDonald ministry. It was a small working group chaired by Keynes, apart from the Economic Advisory Council, to consider economic policy in the Great Depression conditions, comprising also Hubert Henderson and Josiah Stamp from the council, with Arthur Cecil Pigou and Robbins representing academia.

Robbins refused to sign a draft by Keynes of proposals including tariffs and wanted the chance to submit a minority report. Keynes as chair would not grant the request, given that Robbins was in a minority of one. Robbins, who had compared the protectionist views to those of Lord Rothermere and Lord Beaverbrook, walked out of a meeting, and briefed Philip Snowden against the report that contained a version of his criticism, considered himself poorly treated. Bad feeling persisted for years between LSE and Cambridge economists.

Initially, Robbins was opposed to Keynes's 1936 General Theory. His own 1934 treatise on the Great Depression is an analysis belonging to that period of his thought. Later, he accepted the need for government intervention.

== World War II period ==
Robbins joined the British government's Central Economic Information Service in summer 1940, from Cambridge to where the LSE had moved. The Service was split into the Central Statistical Office and the Economic Section, which Robbins headed as Director from September 1941. The points system devised in 1941 for rationing of clothing, footwear and household goods, by Robbins with Peggy Joseph and James Meade, is considered a successful policy.

From 1942 Robbins worked largely on planning for post-war reconstruction, with Meade. When John Boyd Orr and Frank Lidgett McDougall successfully lobbied to put food security on the agenda of the United Nations, Robbins attended the resulting 1943 conference at Hot Springs, Virginia. He represented the United Kingdom also at the Bretton Woods Conference of 1944 and took part in the negotiation of the 1946 Anglo-American loan. Over this period, he became fully reconciled with John Maynard Keynes.

Post-war, Robbins wrote:

I grew up in a tradition in which, while recognition was indeed given to the problems created by the ups and downs of the trade cycle and the fluctuations of aggregate demand, there was a tendency to ignore certain deep-seated possibilities of disharmony, in a way which, I now think, led sometimes to superficiality and sometimes to positive error. I owe much to Cambridge economists, particularly to Lord Keynes and Professor Robertson, for having awakened me from dogmatic slumbers in this very important respect.

== Later life ==
The Robbins Report of 1963 advocated substantial expansion of higher education in the United Kingdom, taking the line, often called now the "Robbins principle", that demand from those suitably qualified should drive its development. There was background at the LSE for the view taken, in work of Richard Layard and Claus Moser, and it drew also on recent ideas of Jean Floud and A. H. Halsey. Robbins became the first Chancellor of the new University of Stirling in 1968. He also advocated major government support for the arts, as well as universities.

In later life, Robbins turned to the history of economic thought, publishing studies on English doctrinal history. His LSE lectures, as he gave them in 1980, were later published.

== Views ==
Robbins is noted as a free market economist, and for his definition of economics.

=== Influences ===
As an undergraduate, Robbins felt he had gained much from Philip Wicksteed's The Common Sense of Political Economy (1910). Within the earlier British tradition, he admired William Stanley Jevons's mastery of statistical evidence, and for theory which he thought had abiding relevance. Skidelsky takes Robbins to be a possible but in any case rare example of a British continuator of John Neville Keynes and his Scope and Method of Political Economy (1891). He corresponded with the American Frank Knight from 1931 until Knight's death in 1972.

=== An Essay on the Nature and Significance of Economic Science (1932) ===
The definition appears in the Essay by Robbins as:

Economics is the science which studies human behaviour as a relationship between ends and scarce means which have alternative uses.

After contention in the 1930s, this definition reached some general acceptance among economists. The book has six chapters, and the second half remains controversial.

The Essay was influenced by Nathan Isaacs, a close friend from the army, and a paper he had given to the Aristotelian Society in June 1931. The same month, Robbins sent Isaacs a copy of his inaugural lecture, commenting (in relation to business cycles) that its content was out of date through not taking account of work of the Austrians Friedrich Hayek and Ludwig von Mises. Hayek's cycle theory, and Jacob Viner's work on the balance of payments for Canada, both developments of the 1920s, were used as contrasting examples, respectively of new theorisation and the checking of existing theories. Part of the intellectual framework was the insistence of Isaacs on the importance of inductive reasoning, where Robbins relied more naturally on deductions.

=== Collectivism ===
Robbins came to dislike collectivism. His early interest in Samuel George Hobson and G. D. H. Cole as proponents of guild socialism led him to join the National Guilds League, but did not last beyond 1920, though he continued longer with socialist views. He became involved in the socialist calculation debate, taking the side of the Austrian School.

== Honours and awards ==
Robbins was appointed a Companion of the Order of the Bath (CB) in the 1944 Birthday Honours. He was elected an International Member of the American Philosophical Society in 1955. On 16 June 1959 he was created a life peer as Baron Robbins, of Clare Market in the City of Westminster. He was elected to the American Academy of Arts and Sciences in 1966. In the 1968 New Year Honours he was appointed a Member of the Order of the Companions of Honour (CH).

Robbins received an Honorary Doctorate from Heriot-Watt University in 1967. The Lionel Robbins Building at the London School of Economics is named after him. Since 2009 that building has had on the exterior of it an installation artwork, Blue Rain, by the American artist Michael Brown. There is also a Lionel Robbins Building at Nottingham Trent University.

== Works ==
The early paper The Representative Firm (1928) has been considered Robbins's most celebrated article. In its origins a talk to the London Economic Club, it attacked a major concept of Alfred Marshall. Ralph George Hawtrey of the Club defended Marshall's ideas in a letter to Robbins, who within weeks submitted a version to Keynes as editor of the Economic Journal.

Robbins' 1966 Chichele lecture on the accumulation of capital (published in 1968) and later work on Smithian economics, The Theory of Economic Policy in English Classical Political Economy, have been described as imprecise.

- "Principles Of Economics", 1923, "Economics"
- "The Dynamics of Capitalism". Economica (16): 31–39. March 1926. JSTOR 2548547.
- Gregory, T.E.; Dalton, Hugh, eds. (1927). "The Optimum Theory of Population". London Essays in Economics: In Honour of Edwin Cannan. London: George Routledge & Sons Ltd. pp. 103–136 – via Internet Archive.
- "The Representative Firm", 1928, EJ.
- "On a Certain Ambiguity in the Conception of Stationary Equilibrium", 1930, EJ.
- Essay on the Nature and Significance of Economic Science, 1932. download
- "Remarks on the Relationship between Economics and Psychology", 1934, Manchester School.
- "Remarks on Some Aspects of the Theory of Costs", 1934, EJ.
- The Great Depression. London: Macmillan and Co. 1934 – via Internet Archive. Scroll to chapter-preview links.
- "The Place of Jevons in the History of Economic Thought". Manchester School. 7 (1): 1–17. 1936. doi:10.1111/j.1467-9957.1936.tb01430.x..
- Economic Planning and International Order. London: Macmillan. 1937 – via Internet Archive.
- "Interpersonal Comparisons of Utility: A Comment", 1938, EJ.
- The Economic Basis of Class Conflict and Other Essays in Political Economy. London: Macmillan and Co., Limited. 1939 – via Internet Archive.
- The Economic Causes of War. London: Jonathan Cape. 1939 – via Internet Archive. (via Mises.org)
- The Economic Problem in Peace and War. 1947 – via Internet Archive.
- The Theory of Economic Policy in English Classical Political Economy. 1952 – via Internet Archive.
- The economist in the twentieth century: and other lectures in political economy. London: Macmillan. 1954 – via Internet Archive.
- Robert Torrens and the Evolution of Classical Economics. 1958 – via Internet Archive.
- Politics and Economics, 1963.
- The University in the Modern World. 1966 – via Internet Archive.
- The Theory of Economic Development in the History of Economic Thought: being the Chichele lectures for 1966. 1968 – via Internet Archive.
- Jacob Viner: A tribute, 1970.
- The Evolution of Modern Economic Theory and Other Papers on the History of Economic Thought. Chicago: Aldine Publishing Company. 1970. doi:10.1007/978-1-349-00876-6 – via Internet Archive.
- Autobiography of an Economist. London and Basingstoke: Macmillan London Ltd. 1971. ISBN 978-0333125083 – via Internet Archive.
- Political Economy, Past and Present: a review of leading theories of economic policy. 1976 – via Internet Archive.
- Against Inflation: Speeches in the Second Chamber. 1979 – via Internet Archive.
- Higher Education Revisited. 1980 – via Internet Archive.
- "Richard Ely Lecture: Economics and Political Economy". The American Economic Review - Papers and Proceedings of the Ninety-Third Annual Meeting of the American Economic Association. 71 (2): 1–10. May 1981. JSTOR 1815684.
- Howson, Susan; Moggridge, Donald, eds. (1990). The Wartime Diaries of Lionel Robbins and James Meade, 1943-45. Palgrave Macmillan. doi:10.1007/978-1-349-10840-4.
- Howson, Susan, ed. (1997). Economic Science and Political Economy: Selected Articles. London: Macmillan. doi:10.1007/978-1-349-12761-0.
- Samuels, Warren J.; Medema, Steven G., eds. (1998). A History of Economic Thought: The LSE Lectures. Princeton, NJ: Princeton University Press. ISBN 978-0691012445. Scroll to chapter-preview links.

== Family ==
On 2 August 1924, Robbins married Iris Elizabeth Harris Gardiner, one of the daughters of the journalist and editor Alfred George Gardiner. They had a daughter and a son; Ann and Richard. His daughter married Christopher Louis McIntosh Johnson in 1958. His son was an artist and sculptor; the LSE has a bust of Lionel Robbins which was made by his son.

== See also ==
- Welfare definition of economics
