= Joseph P. Kamp =

American political activist (1900–1993)

Joseph P. Kamp (May 3, 1900 – June 7, 1993) was a German American political activist from New York who ran the Constitutional Educational League and was jailed in 1950 for contempt of Congress. He was known for his pro-Nazi activities before the U.S. entered World War II, and for his antisemitic views.

== Background ==
Joseph Peter Kamp was born on May 3, 1900, in Yonkers, New York. His parents were German-born Joseph Kamp, tailor, and Margaret Franz Kamp. He attended grammar school in Yonkers and spent a few months at Fordham Prep.

== Career ==
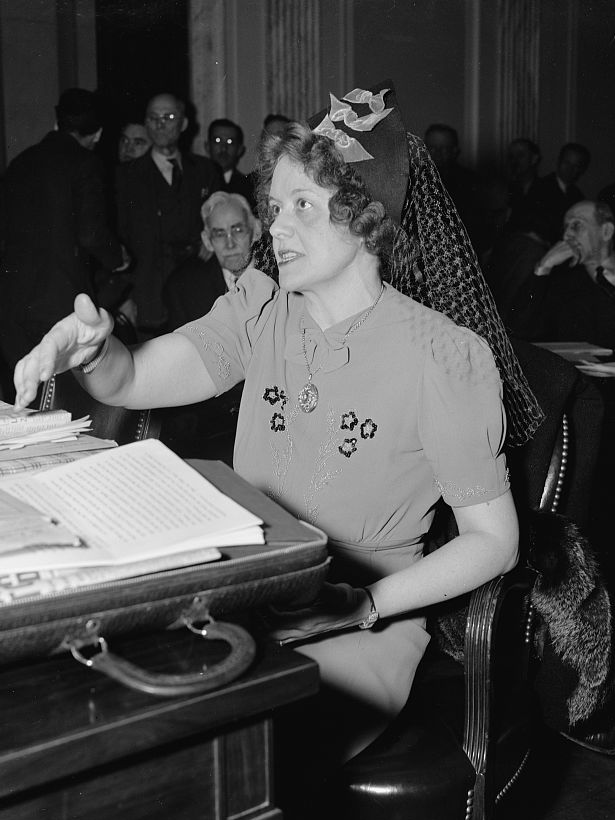
Elizabeth Dilling (pictured in 1939) was an associate of Kamp.

Kamp started his career by working in a law office, followed by work at a newspaper. In 1921, he worked in construction, at which time he first encountered and joined the Constitutional Educational League. By 1925, he had become a public speaker for the League.

In 1934, Kamp became executive editor for The Awakener, founded in 1934 by Harold Lord Varney (manager of the Italian Historical Society, which shared offices with the Constitutional Educational League), with fellow editors Lawrence Dennis (described as “the brains of American fascism”) and Milford W. Howard. The Awakener, described by James Rorty as a pro-fascist magazine which was repeatedly applauded by the Nazi propaganda organ World Service, folded in 1936. Kamp sent a manuscript to the League, which was published in Join the C.I.O. and Help Build a Soviet America. Kamp’s literature, produced for the Constitutional Educational League, was distributed at the German American Bund’s Madison Square Garden Rally in 1939. In 1947, he joined the League's staff as executive vice chairman.

In 1942 and 1943, two federal grand juries issues indictments against people and organizations conspiring against US involvement in World War II; the League appeared both times. During the 1944 presidential campaign, the Constitutional Educational League published a brochure, Vote CIO and Get A Soviet America. A federal grand jury, investigating 1944 campaign expenditures, sought to find out who the League's financial backers, as requested by a congressional subpoena; Kamp refused to answer. In December 1944, Kamp was indicted for contempt of Congress.

Starting on June 16, 1950, Kamp was sentenced to four months in prison for refusing to answer questions, in 1944, regarding campaign activities, as posed by the House Campaign Expenditures Committee. (He was also at odds with the House Lobby Investigating Committee for refusing to share his organization's records.) The United States Supreme Court refused to hear his appeal earlier in 1950. Others who also defied Congress over similar issues include: Edward A. Rumely of the Committee for Constitutional Government and Merwin K. Hart of the National Economic Council, Inc.

Kamp was tried another time for congressional defiance in 1951, when he failed to produce records for the House Lobby Investigating Committee. He was found guilty, but was granted another trial on appeal due to possible jury bias. In 1952, Kamp was acquitted as the House Committee failed to orderly disclose why he was in default. The second contempt charge in relationship with the lobbying activities of the Constitutional Educational League, an anti-communist organization. In 1956, he issued the pamphlet Behind the Plot to Sovietize the South, in which he protested against desegregation. He said the first step after desegregation would be black supremacy, and then Sovietism. Kamp said the civil rights movement had the goal of making the South a "Soviet South", and then a "Soviet America". He went as far as to imply that President Dwight D. Eisenhower was worse than Adolf Hitler for using federal troops to enforce the Brown v. Board ruling.

"Some intemperate Southern leaders have compared Dwight Eisenhower to Adolf Hitler. . . . They are wrong. . . . Hitler had the constitutional right to use Nazi storm troopers in any way he pleased. Eisenhower has no such right to use Federal troops in the South."

In 1958, Time Magazine described him as a “crackpot,… a longtime espouser of fascist causes,… well-versed in the techniques of antiSemitism, [who] tried to undercut President Eisenhower's 1952 campaign by picturing prominent Jews who supported Ike.”

Kamp served as a policy advisor to the Liberty Lobby.

Kamp was a staunch supporter of Joseph McCarthy. He wrote a letter to J. Edgar Hoover in 1953 accusing Jewish organizations of labeling McCarthy “with that damning little Communist smear word ‘anti-Semitic’”.

By the 1970s, he was a contributing editor of American Mercury, described as “one of the ostensibly more reputable organs of US antisemitism”. In an editorial for its 50th edition in 1974, he praised "the intellectual climate" of 50 years ago when "white supremacy was the norm, accepted unquestionably by all respectable people who would not dream of social equality or racial integration with Negroes... a slightly retarded and childish race". Those were the days, he wrote, when "a homogeneous population [was] composed of White Christians drawn from northern Europe" and people "thought of Jews as rather mythical characters in long robes out of the Bible, or harmless, if obnoxious, peddlers".

== Personal life ==
Kamp was a great-uncle of actor Jon Voight through his mother, making him the great great uncle of actress Angelina Jolie.

Kamp died on June 7, 1993 in Jupiter, Florida at the age of 93.

Kamp was associated with Alfred Kohlberg, Merwin K. Hart, Edward A. Rumely, J.B. Matthews, and William F. Buckley Jr. He also associated with Elizabeth Dilling, author of The Red Network—A Who's Who and Handbook of Radicalism for Patriots (1934).

Gerald L. K. Smith (1898–1976) far-right clergyman and leader of the Christian Nationalist Crusade called Kamp a "well-informed and fearless patriot."

== Works ==
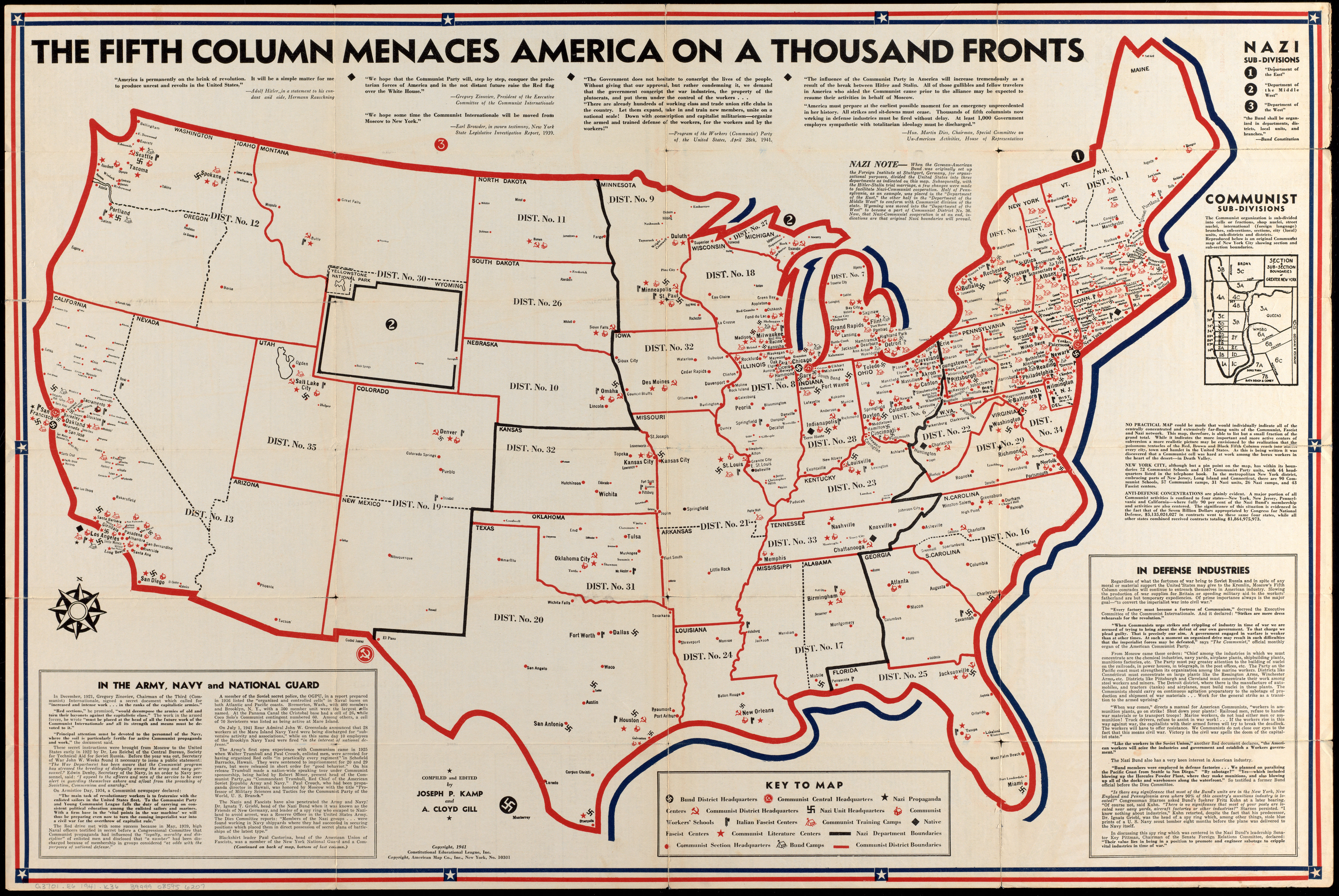
Kamp's map "The Fifth Column Menaces America on a Thousand Fronts" (1941)

Pamphlets

Kamp seems to have penned all pamphlets published by the Constitutional Educational League:

- Hell of Herrin Rages Again (1937)
- Join the C.I.O. and Help Build a Soviet America (1937)
- Stop Lewis and Smash Communism! Program of the Constitutional Educational League (1939)
- Fifth Column in Washington! (1940)
- Fifth Column in the South (1940)
- Fifth Column vs. the Dies Committee (1941)
- The Fifth Column Stops Defense (1941)
- How to Win the War and Lose What We're Fighting For! (1942)
- Native Nazi Purge Plot (1942)
- Famine in America (1943)
- The Class War on the Home Front (1943)
- With Lotions of Love... (1944)
- Vote CIO and Get a Soviet America (1944)
- Hell with G. I. Joe! (1944)
- Audacious Aubrey Williams and the Sly Strategy of Senator Smear (1945)
- Anything But the Truth: The Story of the Man who Lied to Congress (1945)
- How to be an American, to Organize for America, to Fight Un-Americanism (1946)
- Communist Carpetbaggers in Operation Dixie (1946)
- The Fay Case (1946)
- Strikes and the Communists Behind Them (1947)
- Open Letter to Congress. Gentlemen: Are You Mice or Men? An Underworld Secret-Police Terror Menaces America (1948)
- Behind the Lace Curtains of the YWCA (1948)
- Hitler Was a Liberal (1949)
- America Betrayed: The Tragic Consequences of Reds on the Government Payroll! (1950)
- It Isn't Safe to be an American (1950)
- We Must Abolish the United States: The Hidden Facts Behind the Crusade for World Government (1950)
- Was Jesus Christ a Jew? (undated)

Maps

- Join the C.I.O. and help build a Soviet America: a factual narrative (1937)
- The Fifth Column Menaces America on a Thousand Fronts (1941)

Pamphlets by other authors

- Joe Kamp: Hero of the Pro-Fascists (Friends of Democracy)

== See also ==
- Alfred Kohlberg of the John Birch Society
- Edward A. Rumely of the Committee for Constitutional Government
- Merwin K. Hart of the National Economic Council, Inc.
- The Awakener
