= Merwin K. Hart =

American politician (1881–1962)

- Born: June 25, 1881; Utica, New York, U.S.
- Died: November 30, 1962 (aged 81); Manhattan, New York, U.S.
- Resting place: Forest Hill Cemetery; Utica, New York, U.S.
- Education: Harvard University
- Occupations: Lawyer; businessman; politician
- Known for: Hart–Agnew Law; John Birch Society
- Political party: Republican
- Board member of: Utica Mutual Insurance Co.
- Spouses: Katherine Margaret Crouse; Constance Gray

Merwin Kimball Hart (June 25, 1881 – November 30, 1962) was an American lawyer, insurance executive, and politician from New York who founded the National Economic Council, Inc. and was "involved in controversial matters throughout his career."

== Background ==
Merwin K. Hart was born on June 25, 1881, in Utica, New York. His parents were H. Gilbert Hart and Lucy Lord Kimball. In 1904, he obtained a BA from Harvard University (in the same class as Franklin D. Roosevelt). He spent a half year studying in Germany. He then studied law.

== Career ==
In 1905, he joined his father's law firm, Hart-Crouse Company. He formed the "Industrial Liberty League." He then became a director of the New York Radiator Company of Utica, the Chamber of Commerce, and the First National Bank (of which his great-grandfather Ephraim Hart had also been a director).

In 1906, Hart was a Republican member of the New York State Assembly (Oneida Co., 1st D.) in 1907 and 1908. On June 11, 1908, he sponsored the Hart–Agnew Law, an anti-gambling bill passed by the New York Legislature that led to a complete shutdown of horse racing in the State (1911–1912).

In 1909, he formed the "Republic League of Oneida County." In 1911, Hart was admitted to the New York bar.

In 1914, he formed the "Mutual Workmen's Compensation Insurance Company", later the Utica Mutual Insurance Company.

During the First World War, Hart served in France, as Captain, although the Army first wanted Hart to serve in Ordnance; interference by Roosevelt helped Hart get his demanded commission. After the War, Hart returned to practicing law.

From 1926 to 1929, Hart was a member of the New York Industrial Survey Commission.

In April 1929, Hart and others founded the "New York State-wide Economic Council", a legislative lobbying organization that sought to curtail government interference into the economy in the aftermath of the economic collapse in 1929. Roosevelt's New Deal would provide for new challenges to the organization, especially to Hart personally, who saw in the New Deal something far removed from the American way of life. Another factor, Hart believed, too, was interfering with society: Communism. In 1931, the council renamed itself the "New York State Economic Council": Hart gave up practice of the law to become its president.

In 1937 Hart toured Europe and praised Francisco Franco’s Nationalists for opposing Communism. In the 1940s, Hart became briefly a target of Secretary of the Interior Harold L. Ickes. Ickes spoke about "fifth column" interference in the United States at an address at Columbia University, and classified Hart as being part of the "native fascist minded group." Hart demanded a retraction by Ickes, saying that his "statements are absolutely false." In reply, Ickes offered Hart a "trade." "I will retract my statement gladly when I hear that you have come out to fight against the asserted gangs of native Fascists and fifth columnists that are trying to pave the way for the dictators here as they prepared it in other lands; when I hear that you have come out in defense of civil liberties and American democracy. Until then, my dear sir, you remain in my eyes, and in the eyes of the American people, what I said you were." An unsatisfied Hart replied, "I am and always have been absolutely opposed to fascism, nazism and communism in the United States ... [they] are building up in Washington a government well-nigh as fascistic, as despotic, as anything in the dictator countries of Europe." Ickes would later denounce Hart as a bigot, one of the five American "Quislings." Hart accused Ickes of slander again.

In 1943, the council changed its name again, this time to the National Economic Council." A few noted libertarians did some work, Albert Jay Nock, Frank Chodorov and Garet Garrett, but none joined the Council. The National Economic Council itself would work together with the National Committee to Uphold Constitutional Government during the next years, a committee founded by Frank Gannett. After World War II, Hart tried to set up a political action committee, but did not find enough followers.

In 1947, the Anti-Defamation League of B'nai B'rith cited Merwin K. Hart's National Economic Council along with Gerald L. K. Smith's Christian Nationalist Crusade and the Ku Klux Klan as organized anti-Jewish organizations... which had significant influence, resources and membership."

In 1960, Hart became a chairman of the New York branch of the John Birch Society. Although he denied allegations of antisemitism before the Buchanan committee, the 1961 letter of the National Economic Council carried the following statement:

... If there were 6,000,000 Jews within reach of Hitler, which number is widely questioned, and if they have all disappeared, where are they? ... Is it not likely that many of these 6,000,000 claimed to have been killed by Hitler and Eichmann are right here in the United States and are now joining in the agitation for more and more support for the state of Israel—even if the American Republic goes down.

A few years after Hart's death, the indebted National Economic Council was conveyed to Willis Carto.

== Personal life and death ==
On November 20, 1909, Hart married Katherine Margaret Crouse. His second wife was Constance Gray Dall. He had three sons and a daughter.

Hart was a fourth-generation member of Masonic Order Utica Lodge 47.

Hart died on November 30, 1962. He is buried at Forest Hill Cemetery in Utica.

== Legacy ==
Hart appears as a McCarthy-style Red hunter in The Vital Center (1949), in which author Arthur M. Schlesinger, Jr. describes his efforts in the late 1940s:

The most recent textbook witch-hunt provides an edifying example. In August 1947, on the letterhead of an organization calling itself the National Economic Council, Inc., a man named Merwin K. Hart wrote to every member of the boards of trustees of colleges using Elements of Economics, an economic text written by Professor Lorie Tarshis of Stanford University. An enclosed review denounced the book for its exposition of the doctrines of Lord Keynes and identified Keynseianism as a form of Marxism.
Hart's letter had an immediate effect. Organizations of small businessmen passed resolutions in his support. Trusettes and alumni wrote outraged letters to college presidents. Yet who was Merwin K. Hart? His record had been long known to students of the American proto-fascist demimonde ...
Fortunately enough college presidents knew Hart's record to stand up courageously to the uproar ... The American Economic Association eventually appointed a special committee to deal with the attacks on the Tarshis book and on other economic texts.

== Works ==
- America, Look at Spain (New York: P.J. Kennedy & Sons, 1939)

== See also ==
- Edward A. Rumely of the Committee for Constitutional Government
- Joseph P. Kamp of the Constitutional Educational League

New York State Assembly
Preceded by Henry L. Gates	New York State Assembly; Oneida County, 1st District; 1907–1908	Succeeded by John W. Manley
