= Communazi =

American neologism for Hitler-Stalin Pact

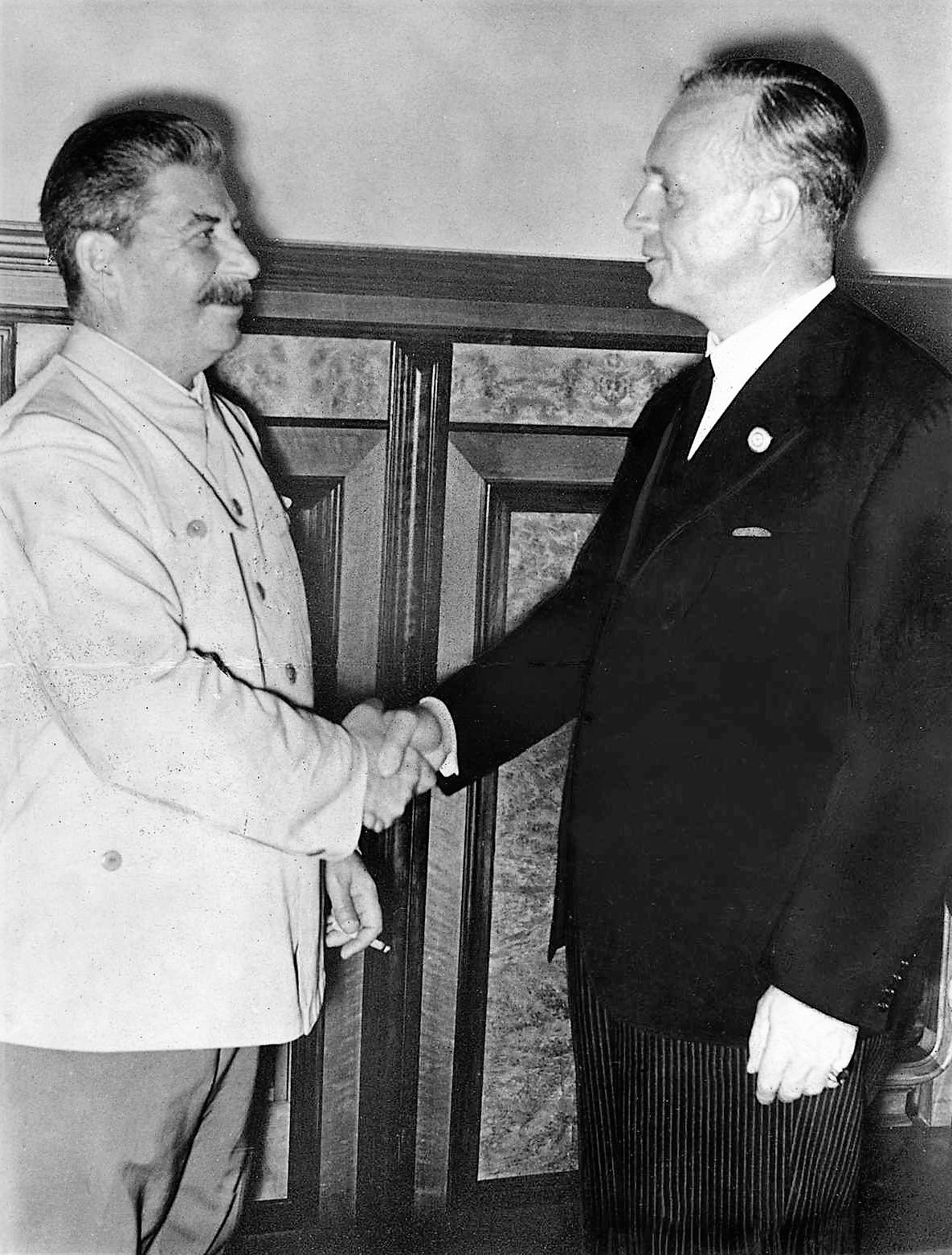
Joseph Stalin shakes hands with Joachim von Ribbentrop after signing of Molotov–Ribbentrop Pact (aka "Communazi Pact") on 23 August 1939.

"Communazi" is an American political neologism, "coined by a reporter" and made popular by Time (first September 11, 1939) days after the Molotov–Ribbentrop Pact (a neutrality pact between Nazi Germany and the Soviet Union signed in Moscow on 23 August 1939 by foreign ministers Joachim von Ribbentrop and Vyacheslav Molotov). It implied that both Communism and Nazism were one and the same because they were essentially totalitarian, whether left or right in belief. It continues to receive mention, largely in its historical context, to the present.

== History ==
Time repeatedly referred to the Pact as the "Communazi Pact" and its participants as "communazis" through 1941. Among Time writers and editors who used the term was Whittaker Chambers in his 1941 essay "The Revolt of the Intellectuals."

Whether coined or popularized by Time, the term then started appearing in print in other publications, at first in labor-oriented (but non-Soviet-aligned) publications, then in wider-circulating publications, by right-wing writers (e.g., Joseph P. Kamp of the Constitutional Educational League), in other English-speaking countries like Canada and the United Kingdom, and eventually in German:

- Newspapers:
  - "Allen Tells Dies Hitler Was 'Sound'" (25 August 1939)
  - "Two States, Two Gatherings and a Lot of Anti-Government Sentiment; At Michigan Rally, Unyielding Anger At the Brady Bill" (15 May 1995)
  - "Fighting the Nazis With Celluloid" (12 October 2014)
- Magazines:
  - The Garment Worker (1939)
  - American Labor World (1939)
  - Frontiers of Democracy (1939)
  - Journeymen Plumbers and Steam Fitters Journal (1939)
  - Dynamic America (1940)
  - Saturday Review (1940)
  - Political Correspondence of the Workers' League for a Revolutionary Party (1940)
  - Mexicana Review (1940)
  - Twice a Year by Dorothy Norman (1941)
  - Labour Monthly (1942)
- Books:
  - Yankee Reporter by S. Burton Heath (1940)
  - The Fifth Column Vs. the Dies Committee by Joseph P. Kamp (1941)
  - Common Cause by Giuseppe Antonio Borgese (1940)
  - Events and Shadows by Robert Gilbert Vansittart Baron Vansittart (1947)
  - Must We Perish? by Hershel D. Meyer (1949)
  - Report of the Proceedings of the Annual Convention of the American Federation of Labor (1970)
  - Labor Radical by Len De Caux (1970)
  - A Study in Liberty by Horace Mayer Kallen (1973)
  - United Nations: Perfidy and Perversion by Hillel Seidman (1982)
  - Lion Feuchtwanger by Volker Skierka (1984)
  - Dear editor: letters to Time magazine, 1923–1984 (1985)
  - Das mexikanische Exil by Fritz Pohle (1986)
  - America and the Holocaust: Barring the gates to America by David S. Wyman (1990)
  - Literatur für Leser (1992)
  - Argonautenschiff: Jahrbuch der Anna-Seghers-Gesellschaft (1992)
  - Which Side Were You On? by Maurice Isserman (1993)
  - Hollywood Party by Lloyd Billingsley (1998)
  - A Covert Life: Jay Lovestone by Ted Morgan (writer) (1999)
  - Communazis by Alexander Stephan (2000)
  - British and American Anticommunism Before the Cold War by FI:Markku Ruotsila (2001)
  - The FBI Encyclopedia by Michael Newton (2003)
  - Adolf Kozlik by Gottfried Fritzi (2004)
  - Überwacht, Ausgebürgert, Exiliert by Alexander Stephan (2007)
  - Adorno in America by David Jenemann (2007)
  - Engineering Communism by Steve Usdin (2008)
  - Shame and Glory of the Intellectuals by Peter Viereck (2007)
  - Antisemitism and the American Far Left by Stephen Harlan Norwood (2013)
  - Open a New Window by Ethan Mordden (2015)

In 1940, the term "communazi" started to appear in the government records of the US, the House of Commons of Canada, and the UK House of Lords.

"Communazi" is also the subject of a book, "Communazis": FBI Surveillance of German Émigré Writers, published in 2000 by Alexander Stephan.

== See also ==
- Comparison of Nazism and Stalinism
- Horseshoe theory
- National Bolshevism
- Beefsteak Nazi
- Red fascism
