= Edward Rumely =

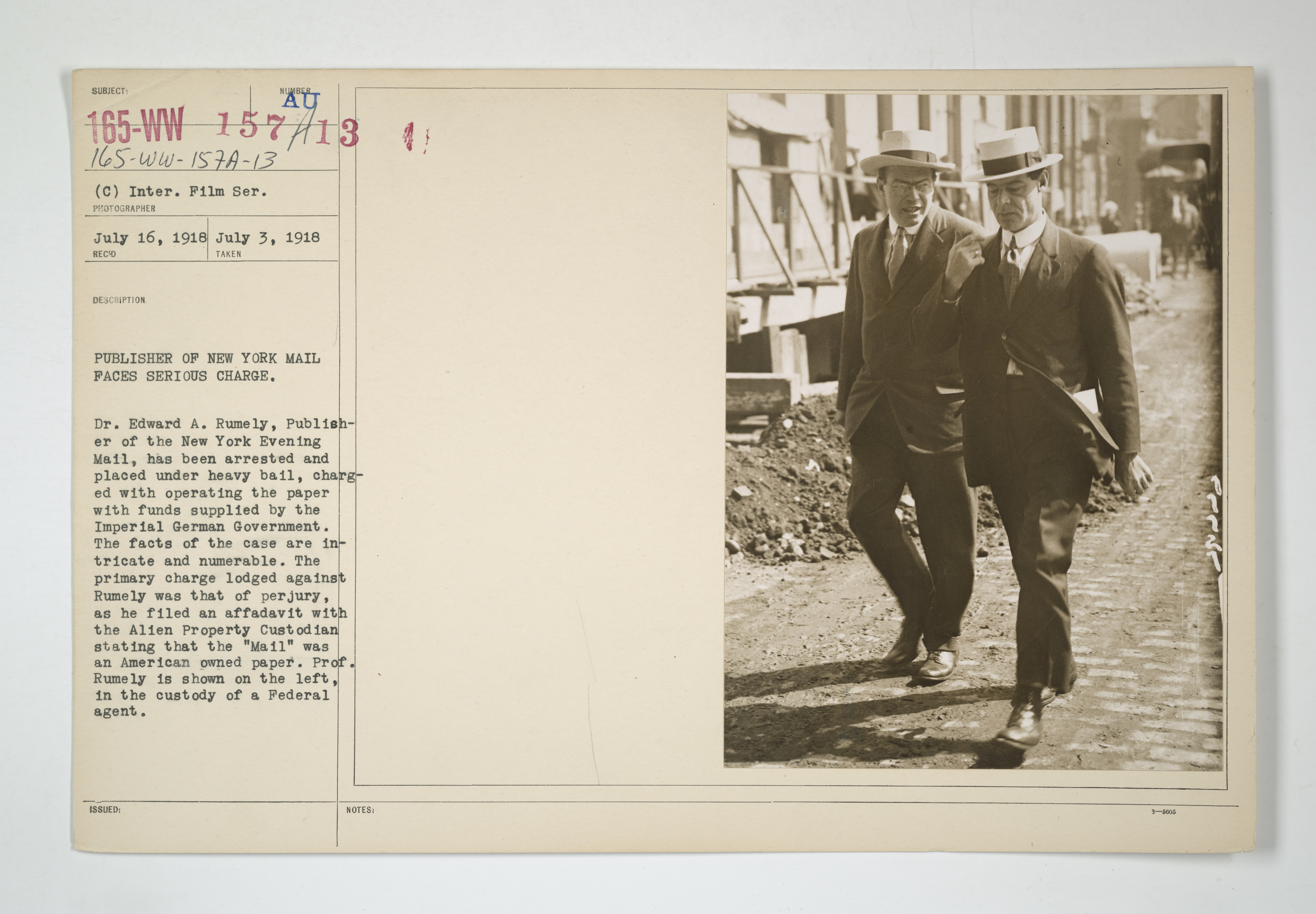
Original Caption: Publisher of New York Mail faced serious charge. Dr. Edward A. Rumely, publisher of the New York Evening Mail, has been arrested and placed under heavy bail, charged with operating the paper with funds supplied by the Imperial German Government. The facts of the care are intricate and numerable. The primary charge lodged against Rumely was that of perjury, as he filed an affidavit with the Alien Property Custodian stating that the "Mail" was an American owned paper. Professor Rumely is shown on the left, in the custody of a Federal agent.

Edward Aloysius Rumely (1882 – November 26, 1964) was a physician, educator, and newspaper man from Indiana.

== Education ==
Rumely was born in La Porte, Indiana, in 1882. He attended University of Notre Dame, Oxford University and the University of Heidelberg. He graduated from the University of Freiburg, where he received his M.D. in 1906.

== Interlaken School ==
It is said that while he studied in Germany, he lived on nuts, herbs and other uncooked foods and wore sandals and scanty clothes, under the influence of views espoused by Leo Tolstoy. But he came back with every appearance of normality and founded the Interlaken School at La Porte, the school where boys did all their own work, from carpentry up.

Rumely married one of the teachers at Interlaken in 1910, Fanny Scott. The Interlaken School closed in 1918 due to anti-German sentiments associated with World War I. Isamu Noguchi was one of the last students to enroll at Interlaken before it closed.

== Family business ==
While running the school, Rumely was also active in the family tractor business. He used his technological interest to develop the Rumely Oil Pull Farm Tractor, which burned kerosene. The Rumely family lost control of their own company due to Edward's mishandling of the company's assets. The Rumely Hotel was built in 1913 in La Porte when Edward was still in charge of the family business.→Advance-Rumely

== Publishing ==
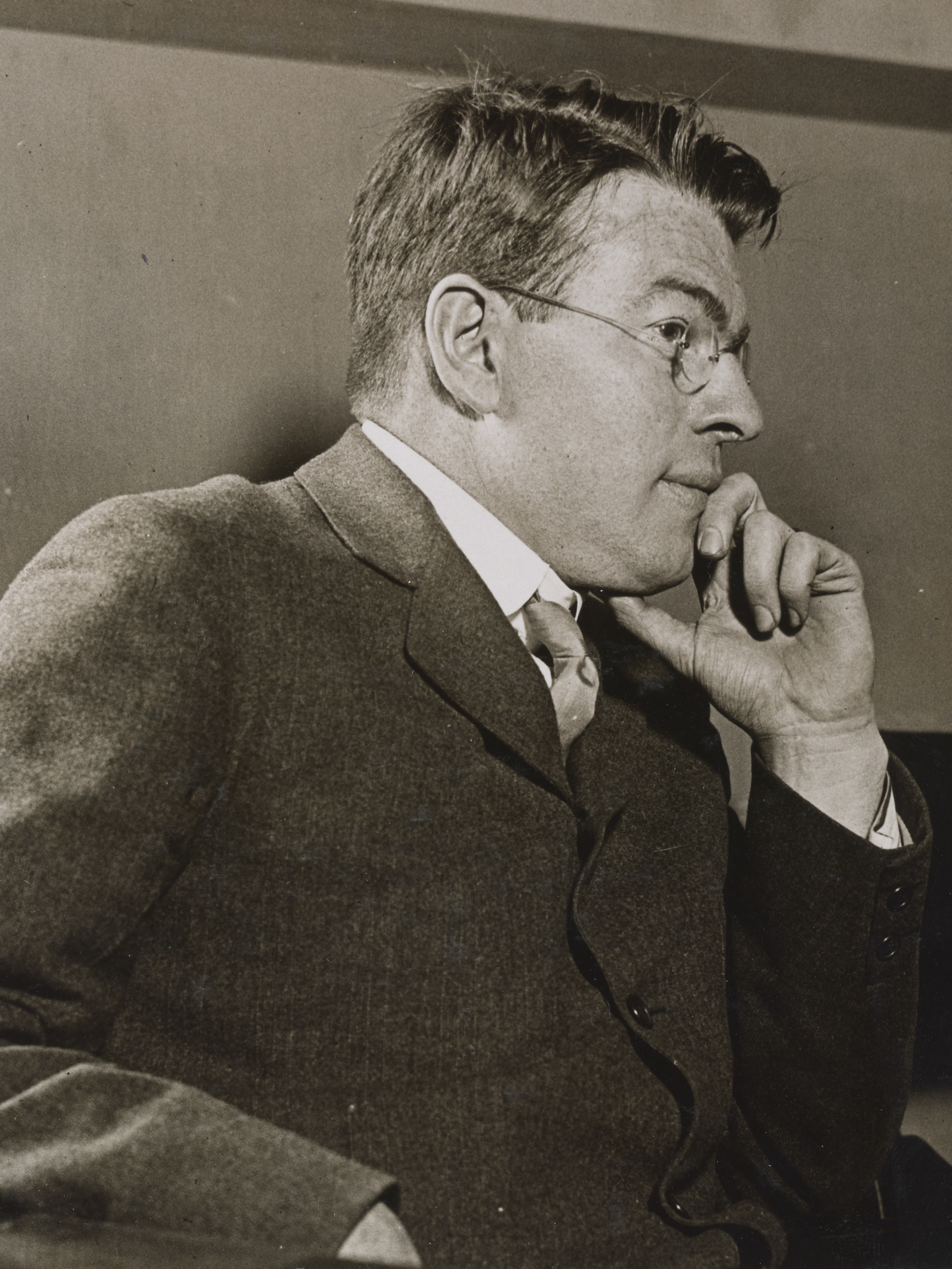
Edward Rumely on July 11, 1918

When the First World War broke out in Europe, Rumely was pro-German and outraged by the pro-British slant of most American newspapers. Thus, in 1915, Rumely bought and became editor-in-chief and publisher of the New York Evening Mail. Since he was a good friend of Theodore Roosevelt, he permitted him to use the newspaper as his mouthpiece. Roosevelt contributed one, and possibly many more, editorials on the subject of the development of the American merchant marine. Two other critics who wrote articles for the paper were Samuel Sidney McClure and H. L. Mencken.

Rumely's ownership caused him to be part of three major court cases, mostly due to perjury. In July 1918 Rumely was arrested and convicted of violation of the Trading with the Enemy Act. He was sentenced to one year and one day in prison. To get financing for the purchase of the newspaper Rumely was accused of receiving financing from the German government, which Rumely denied, claiming, instead, he had received money to buy the paper from an American citizen in Germany. He had failed to report this when he received the money. Before Rumely was sent to prison, President Coolidge reduced his sentence to one year, allowing him to serve his time in a local prison.

== Political activism ==
From 1926 to 1930 Rumely assisted farmers in obtaining loans through the Agricultural Bond and Credit Company. This began his life's work of educating the public on monetary reform, farm credits in agriculture, and the value of the Constitution. Rumely believed that deflation was destabilizing American agriculture, and that monetary reform was necessary.

To this end, in 1932 he formed and served as executive secretary of the Committee for the Nation for Rebuilding Purchasing Power and Prices. This committee sought to lower the gold content of the dollar by fifty percent and, thus, raise commodity prices. This program relied on Populist notions of how money and prices worked and was disputed by most orthodox economists. Franklin Roosevelt followed through on this and took the U.S. off of the gold standard adopted the Agricultural Adjustment Act to support farm prices.

Rumely and most members of the Committee for the Nation (as it was soon called) turned against Roosevelt's New Deal policies that they considered anti-business. When Roosevelt proposed in 1937 to increase the number of justices on the Supreme Court many Committee members, including publisher Frank Gannett joined to oppose the plan in the National Committee to Uphold Constitutional Government. Rumely served as executive secretary of this newly renamed and reformed committee. According to some accounts, Rumely coined the phrase the "court packing plan" and used the National Committee to lobby against the increase.

In 1938, the United States Senate Lobby Investigation Committee, chaired by Senator Sherman A. Minton, demanded the names of those who had contributed over one thousand dollars to his organization, arguing that the public had a right to know who backed it. Rumely refused to comply, citing the First Amendment. Although Minton considered charging Rumely with contempt of Congress, John J. Abt, a special assistant to the Attorney General and a secret member of the Communist Party (an organization publicly opposed to Rumely), successfully recommended against it. Abt predicted that a jury conviction of Rumely for contempt was unlikely and that a trial might make him into an unintended civil liberties martyr.

In 1941, the Committee to Uphold Constitutional Government reformulated as the Committee for Constitutional Government, (CCG) with Rumely again serving as executive secretary. In 1950, the U.S. House, on the recommendation of the U.S. House Select Committee on Lobbying, otherwise known as the Buchanan Committee, cited Rumely for contempt for refusing to provide names of those who purchased books published by the CCG. In the landmark decision of United States v. Rumely, the Supreme Court upheld a reversal of conviction made by the U.S. Court of Appeals for the District of Columbia. In 1958, the U.S. Supreme Court cited United States v. Rumely as precedent for NAACP v. Alabama, which struck down a state law requiring that the organization provide private membership lists.

== Retirement ==
Rumely returned to La Porte in 1959 due to ill health. He spent his remaining years promoting cancer education and helped to spread the word on the effectiveness of the Pap smear test.

Edward A. Rumely died after choking on his food while eating dinner in 1964.

== Bibliography ==
The Gravest Days; Editorials Reprinted from The Evening Mail of New York City. New York, NY: New York Evening Mail, 1916. Copyright Edward A. Rumely, 1916. CONTENTS: Causes of the war—Issues of International Law—The Submarine Issue—The British Blockade.—The Freedom of the Seas—Mail Seizures—The British Black List—Ship Seizures—Red Cross—Humanity and Atrocity—Greece—Poland—The war in the West—The War in the East—The Italian Front—In the Balkans—The Dardanelles—The War in Asia Minor—The Naval War—Finances of the Belligerents—Conditions in Allied Countries—Conditions in Central Powers—Conditions in Neutral Countries—Peace—Nationalism and Internationalism—Mexico—Japan—Our Foreign Trade—Trade War, After the War—Merchant Marine—A Protective Tariff—American Preparedness—Army—The Garrison Plan—Universal Service—The Navy—Industrial Preparedness in General—Manufacturing Preparedness—Transportation Preparedness—Our Finances—Americanism—Political Issues, Autumn, 1916.

== See also ==
- Merwin K. Hart of the National Economic Council, Inc.
- Joseph P. Kamp of the Constitutional Educational League
