= Keynesian Revolution =

Economic theory

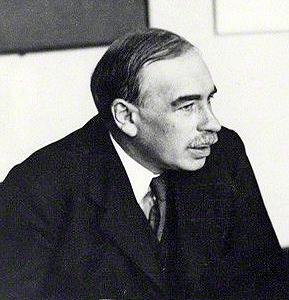
John Maynard Keynes

The Keynesian Revolution was a fundamental reworking of economic theory concerning the factors determining employment levels in the overall economy. The revolution was set against the then orthodox economic framework, namely neoclassical economics.

The early stage of the Keynesian Revolution took place in the years following the publication of John Maynard Keynes' General Theory in 1936. It saw the neoclassical understanding of employment replaced with Keynes' view that demand, and not supply, is the driving factor determining levels of employment. This provided Keynes and his supporters with a theoretical basis to argue that governments should intervene to alleviate severe unemployment. With Keynes unable to take much part in theoretical debate after 1937, a process swiftly got underway to reconcile his work with the old system to form neo-Keynesian economics, a mixture of neoclassical economics and Keynesian economics. The process of mixing these schools is referred to as the neoclassical synthesis, and Neo-Keynesian economics may be summarized as "Keynesian in macroeconomics, neoclassical in microeconomics".

== Historical context ==
The revolution was primarily a change in mainstream economic views and in providing a unified framework – a number of the ideas and policy prescriptions advocated by Keynes had ad hoc precursors in the underconsumptionist school of 19th-century economics, and some forms of government stimulus were practiced in 1930s United States without the intellectual framework of Keynesianism.

The central policy change was the proposition that government action could change the level of unemployment, via deficit spending (fiscal stimulus) such as by public works or tax cuts, and changes in interest rates and money supply (monetary policy) – the prevailing orthodoxy prior to that point was the Treasury view that government action could not change the level of unemployment.

The driving force was the economic crisis of the Great Depression and the 1936 publication of The General Theory of Employment, Interest and Money by John Maynard Keynes, which was then reworked into a neoclassical framework by John Hicks, particularly the IS/LM model of 1936/37. This synthesis was then popularized in American academia in the influential textbook Economics by Paul Samuelson from 1948 onward, and came to dominate post-World War II economic thinking in the United States. The term "Keynesian Revolution" itself was used in the 1947 text The Keynesian Revolution by American economist Lawrence Klein. In the United States, the Keynesian Revolution was initially actively fought by conservatives during the Second Red Scare (McCarthyism) and accused of Communism, but ultimately a form of Keynesian economics became mainstream; see textbooks of the Keynesian revolution.

The Keynesian revolution has been criticized on a number of grounds: some, particularly the freshwater school and Austrian school, argue that the revolution was misguided and incorrect; by contrast, other schools of Keynesian economics, notably Post-Keynesian economics, argue that the "Keynesian" revolution ignored or distorted a number of Keynes's fundamental insights, and did not go far enough.

== Theory of employment ==
A central aspect of the Keynesian revolution was a change in theory concerning the factors determining employment levels in the overall economy. The revolution was set against the orthodox classical economic framework, and its successor, neoclassical economics, which, based on Say's law, argued that unless special conditions prevailed, the free market would naturally establish full employment equilibrium with no need for government intervention. This view held that employers will be able to make a profit by employing all available workers as long as workers drop their wages below the value of the total output they are able to produce – and classical economics assumed that in a free market workers would be willing to lower their wage demands accordingly, because they are rational agents who would rather work for less than face unemployment.

Keynes argued that both Say's law and the assumption that economic actors always behave rationally are misleading simplifications, and that the classical economics was only reliable at describing a special case. The Keynesian Revolution replaced the classical understanding of employment with Keynes's view that employment is a function of demand, not supply.

== Other "revolutions" in economics ==
=== Prior to Keynes ===
Professor Harry Johnson has written that economics in its modern form can be seen as dawning with the Smithian Revolution against mercantilism. Prior to Keynes there were five other major developments in economic thought rapid enough in pace to be characterised as revolutions, most notably the Ricardian. Another noted revolution is the marginalist revolution, which is taken to mark the transition from classical economics to neoclassical economics in the 1870s. Collectively, these fashioned the classical economic orthodoxy that Keynes attacked.

Note however that in economic practice, as opposed to economic theory, the behavior of industrializing nations in the 19th century has frequently been described as mercantilist or embodying economic nationalism, as in the American School of 19th-century American economic practice.

=== After Keynes ===
The rise of Monetarism, particularly in the 1970s and via the work of Milton Friedman, is considered the next major change in mainstream economic theory and practice, and has at times been described as the "monetarist revolution". The stagflation of the 1970s led to a loss of influence by classical Keynesian economics, and continuing tensions between Keynesian economics and neoclassical economics led in the 1970s to the division between New Keynesian economics and New classical macroeconomics; these are also referred to as the saltwater school and freshwater school, due to the American universities with which they are associated. In development economics, this period is referred to as the Washington Consensus period, and the economic expansion of the 1980s, 1990s, and early 2000s has been referred to as The Great Moderation.

Within academia the post WWII high point of free market economics occurred in the 1990s, with several free market economists winning the Nobel Prize. Increased skepticism concerning the free market consensus was fueled by the 1997 Asian financial crisis and the dot-com bubble. The 2008 financial crisis led to a resurgence of interest in Keynesian economics, the 2008–2009 Keynesian resurgence.

== Background ==
When Keynes published his General Theory in 1936, the influence of free market economics on policy making had already declined substantially compared to the almost unchallenged ascendancy it had enjoyed in Britain during the 1840s - 1860s. By the mid-1930s much of the first and second world was already under the sway of communism or fascism, with even the US departing from economic orthodoxy with the New Deal. There had not been a corresponding decline for neoclassical economics in the academic sphere however. According to economic historian Richard Cockett, within academia the prestige of free market economics was still near its peak even in the 1920s. In the 1930s neoclassical economics began to be challenged within academia, though at first by various diverse schools which apart from Marxism were mostly of only local influence - such as the Stockholm school in Sweden or in the US the Administered price theorists.

In 1930, Keynes was in his late forties, and in October his A Treatise on Money was published. It was criticized by Ralph Hawtrey, Dennis Robertson and Friedrich Hayek. However, so-called "Circus", consisted of Richard Kahn, James Meade, Piero Sraffa, Joan Robinson and Austin Robinson, began a seminar to examine the Treatise. Keynes did not attend these seminars but was informed of their discussions by Kahn. Keynes was little influenced by the various heterodox economists of the 1930s, his General theory was written largely in a Marshellian framework though with some important points of dissent such as the idea that excessive savings can be harmful for the overall economy. Keynes asserts that when savings exceed available investment opportunities it makes it impossible for business as a whole to make a profit and so layoffs and increased unemployment will result. In chapter 23 of the General Theory Keynes traces the genesis of this idea to, among others, Mercantilist thinkers of the previous three centuries, to the Fable of the Bees and to the dissenting economist J A Hobson with his Physiology of industry (1889).

== The course of Keynesian Revolution ==
(Colander & Landreth 1996) argue that there are three components to the Keynesian revolution: a policy revolution, a theoretical (or intellectual) revolution, and a textbook revolution. These are addressed in turn.

=== Intellectual ===
Keynes's revolutionary theory was set out in his book General Theory of Employment, Interest and Money, commonly referred to by the abbreviated title General Theory. While working on the book, Keynes wrote to George Bernard Shaw, saying "I believe myself to be writing a book on economic theory which will largely revolutionize, not I suppose at once but in the course of the next ten years – the way the world thinks about economic problems … I don't merely hope what I say, in my own mind I'm quite sure" Professor Keith Shaw wrote that this degree of self-confidence was quite amazing especially considering it took more than fifty years for the Newtonian revolution to gain universal recognition; but also that Keynes's confidence was fully justified. John Kenneth Galbraith has written that Say's law dominated economic thought prior to Keynes for over a century, and the shift to Keynesianism was difficult. Economists who contradicted the law, which inferred that underemployment and underinvestment (coupled with over-saving) were virtually impossible, risked losing their careers.

Keynes's General Theory was published in 1936 and provoked considerable controversy, yet according to professor Gordon Fletcher it rapidly conquered professional opinion.

For biographer Lord Skidelsky, the General Theory triggered a massive reaction immediately after its release, with extensive reviews in journals and popular newspapers all around the world. While a number of academics were critical, even the harshest critics recognised there was a case to be answered. As with other theoretical revolutions, the young were most receptive with some older economists never fully accepting Keynes's work, but by 1939 Keynes's view had broadly gained ascendancy both in Great Britain and the US.

According to Murray Rothbard, an Austrian School economist strongly opposed to Keynes:

the General Theory was, at least in the short run, one of the most dazzlingly successful books of all time. In a few short years, his "revolutionary" theory had conquered the economics profession and soon had transformed public policy, while old-fashioned economics was swept, unhonored and unsung, into the dustbin of history.

Rothbard goes on to describe that by the end of the 1930s every single one of Friedrich Hayek's followers at the LSE was convinced by Keynes's ideas – all economists who had previously opposed Keynes's advocacy of state intervention in the economy.

Despite Keynes's early success, the revolutionary effect on theoretical economics was soon diminished. From the late 1930s, a process began to reconcile the General Theory with the classical ways of viewing the economy – developments which included Neo-Keynesian and later New Keynesian economics.

An alternative take was advocated at the dawning of the revolution by Dennis Robertson, who Fletcher has described as the most intellectually formidable of Keynes's contemporary critics. This view held that the great excitement triggered by the General Theory was unjustified – that genuinely new ideas presented were overstated and not supported by evidence, while the verifiable ideas were merely well-established principles dressed up in new ways. According to Hyman Minsky, this position eventually became dominant in mainstream academia, though it is by no means unchallenged.

==== Origins ====
"Capitalism is the astounding belief that the most wickedest of men will do the most wickedest of things for the greatest good of everyone."

— John Maynard Keynes

Lord Skidelsky has written that Keynes's motivation for the revolution arose from the failure of the British economy to recover from its post World War I recession in the manner predicted by classical economics – throughout the 1920s British unemployment remained at historically high levels not previously seen since a brief period in the aftermath of the Napoleonic Wars. Skidelsky notes a December 1922 lecture to the British Institute of Bankers where Keynes noted that wages no longer fell with prices in the classical fashion, due in part to the power of unions and wage "stickiness". Keynes recommended government intervention as the cure for unemployment in this circumstance, a position he never deviated from though he was to refine his thinking on what sort of intervention would work best. For Dr Peter the revolution can be seen as dawning in 1924 which was when Keynes first started advocating public works as a means by which the government could stimulate the economy and tackle unemployment.

=== Policy ===
While much attention is given to the impact on academic economics, the revolution also had a practical dimension. It influenced decision makers in governments, central banks and global institutions like the International Monetary Fund (IMF). According to Lord Skidelsky, the revolution began in policy making terms as early as December 1930, with Keynes's participation in the Macmillan Committee on Finance and Industry. The Committee had been formed to make policy recommendations for Britain's economic recovery – while Keynes's plans for an interventionist response were rejected, he did succeed in convincing the government that the classical conception that wages would drop along with prices and thus help to restore employment after a recession was wrong. The first government to adopt Keynesian demand management policies was Sweden in the 1930s.

Keynes had some influence on President Roosevelt's 1933–1936 New Deal, though this package was not as radical or as sustained as Keynes had wished. After 1939 Keynes's ideas were adopted in the late 1940s, 1950s, and most of the 1960s, this period had been referred to as the Golden age of capitalism and the Age of Keynes, by others. From the late sixties Keynes's influence was displaced following the success of "counter revolutionary" efforts by economists like Milton Friedman and others sympathetic to the free market. Following the 2008 financial crisis, there was a revival in Keynesian thinking among policy makers in favour of robust government intervention, which the Financial Times has described as a "stunning reversal of the orthodoxy of the past several decades".

=== Textbooks ===
The importance and history of textbooks is less studied than other aspects of the Keynesian revolution, but some argue that it is of fundamental importance.

In the United States, the 1948 textbook Economics by Paul Samuelson was the key textbook that spread the Keynesian revolution. It was not however the first Keynesian textbook, being preceded by the 1947 The Elements of Economics, by Lorie Tarshis. Tarshis's book, the first American textbook to discuss Keynesian ideas, was initially widely adopted, but was subsequently attacked by American conservatives (as part of the Second Red Scare, or McCarthyism), donors to universities withheld donations, and subsequently the text was largely withdrawn. Tarshis's text was subsequently attacked in the 1951 God and Man at Yale by American conservative William F. Buckley, Jr.

Samuelson's Economics was also subject to "conservative business pressuring" and accusations of Communism, but the attacks were less "virulen[t]" and Economics became established. The success of Samuelson's book is attributed to various factors, notably Samuelson's dispassionate, scientific style, in contrast to Tarshis's more engaged style. Subsequent texts have followed Samuelson's style.

== Keynesian Revolution questioned ==
According to post Keynesian economists and some others such as Charles Goodhart, in the academic sphere the so called revolution failed to properly get off the ground, with neo-Keynesian economics being Keynesian in name only. Such critics have held that Keynes's thinking was misunderstood or misrepresented by the revolution’s leading popularisers, the founders of neo-Keynesian economics such as John Hicks and Paul Samuelson. The post Keynesians felt neo-Keynesianism excessively compromised with the classical view. For Paul Davidson the revolution was "aborted" in its early years; for Hyman Minsky it was "still born"; while for Joan Robinson the revolution led to a "bastard Keynesianism".

A suggested reason for the distortion is the central role John Hicks's IS/LM model played in helping other economists understand Keynes's theory – for post Keynesians, and by the 1970s even Hicks himself, the model distorted Keynes's vision.

A second reason offered is the attacks on the more progressive expressions of Keynes's views that occurred due to McCarthyism. For example, while initially popular, Lorie Tarshis's 1947 textbook introducing Keynes's ideas, The elements of economics was soon heavily attacked by those influenced by McCarthy. The book's place as a leading textbook for Keynes's ideas in America was taken by Paul Samuelson's Principles of Economics. According to Davidson, Samuelson failed to understand one of the key pillars of the revolution, the refutation ergodic axiom (i.e., saying that economic decision makers are always confronted by uncertainty – the past isn't a reliable predictor of the future).

Economists Robert Shiller and George Akerlof re-asserted the importance of recognising uncertainty in their 2009 book Animal Spirits.

Another reason for the distortion of Keynes's views was his low level of participation in the intellectual debates that followed the publication of his General Theory, first due to his heart attack in 1937 and then due to his preoccupation with the war. It has been suggested by Lord Skidelsky that apart from his busyness and incapacity, Keynes didn't challenge models like IS/LM as he perceived that from a pragmatic point of view they would be a useful compromise.

== Significance ==
Professor Gordon Fletcher stated that Keynes's General Theory provided a conceptual justification for policies of government intervention in economic affairs which was lacking in the established economics of the day – immensely significant as in the absence of a proper theoretical underpinning there was a danger that ad hoc policies of moderate intervention would be overtaken by extremist solutions, as had already happened in much of Europe back in the 1930s before the revolution was launched. Almost 80 years later in 2009, Keynes's ideas were once again a central inspiration for the global response to the 2008 financial crisis.

== See also ==
- John Maynard Keynes
- 2008–2009 Keynesian resurgence
- Post-war displacement of Keynesianism
- Keynesian economics
- Paradigm Shift
