= Alexander Stephan =

German literary scholar (1946–2009)

Dr. Alexander Stephan
- Born: August 16, 1946; Lüdenscheid, Germany
- Died: May 29, 2009 (aged 62); Berlin, Germany
- Education: University of Michigan; Princeton University
- Scientific career
- Fields: Literature
- Workplaces: Ohio State University; University of Florida

Alexander Stephan (August 16, 1946 – May 29, 2009) was a specialist in German literature and area studies. He was a professor, Ohio Eminent Scholar, and Senior Fellow of the Mershon Center for International Security Studies at Ohio State University (OSU).

== Background ==
Stephan studied American and German literature at the Freie Universität in Berlin and at the University of Michigan. He obtained his Ph.D. from Princeton University.

== Career ==
Subsequently, he taught at Princeton, the University of California-Los Angeles (UCLA) and University of Florida. At Ohio State University, he held a research professorship in German literature and area studies.

As professor of German literature, Stephan focused on the modern period. His publications covered the history of German exile literature, the Weimar Republic, and the literature of the German Democratic Republic (GDR). He was the author of books, among others, on Anna Seghers, Christa Wolf, Max Frisch, and Peter Weiss. Stephan was also the first researcher who obtained access to the documents which the FBI kept on German exile writers such as Bertolt Brecht, Lion Feuchtwanger, Thomas Mann and Anna Seghers.

At the OSU Mershon Center, Stephan concentrated on international security and US-European cultural relations. He wrote about the impact of American culture on the GDR and published five collections of essays analyzing Americanization and anti-Americanism in Germany and in Europe after 1945.

Stephan was a founder of the book series Exilstudien/Exile Studies, a member of the German PEN, and a recipient of grants from the Guggenheim Foundation, Humboldt Foundation, and numerous other institutions. His publications were discussed on German television, by CNN, and in papers such as The New York Times, The New York Review of Books, The Nation, and The Guardian.

== Legacy ==
A Festschrift honoring Stephan, and entitled, Kulturpolitik und Politik der Kultur/Cultural Politics and the Politics of Culture (Oxford) appeared in 2007. It was edited by Helen Fehervary and Bernd Fischer.

His widow, Halina Stephan, is a Professor of Slavic and East European Languages and Literatures. She has been director of the Center for Slavic and East European Studies at Ohio State University. She specializes in Russian avant-garde literature and Polish theatre.

== Works ==
Books (selection):

- Überwacht, ausgebürgert, exiliert. Schriftsteller und der Staat. Bielefeld, 2007.
- Im Visier des FBI. Deutsche Exilschriftsteller in den Akten amerikanischer Geheimdienste. Stuttgart, 1995, rev. pb. Berlin, 1998
  - "Communazis": FBI Surveillance of German Émigré Writers (2000)
- Anna Seghers: 'Das siebte Kreuz'. Welt und Wirkung eines Romans. Berlin, 1997.
- Anna Seghers im Exil. Bonn, 1993.
- Max Frisch. München, 1983.
- Christa Wolf. München, 1976, 4th, enl. and rev. ed. 1991.
- Die deutsche Exilliteratur. München, 1979.

Books in preparation:

- Left Behind. Popular Culture, Religious Fundamentalism and Politics in the USA of George W. Bush.
- Das Dritte Reich und die Exilliteratur. Ausbürgerung und Überwachung deutscher Autoren durch Behörden des Nazistaates.

Edited volumes (selection):

- America on my mind. Zur Amerikanisierung der deutschen Kultur seit 1945 (with Jochen Vogt). München, 2006.
- The Americanization of Europe: Culture, Diplomacy, and Anti-Americanism after 1945. New York, 2006, pb. 2007.
- Das Amerika der Autoren. Von Kafka bis 09/11 München, 2006.
- Exile and Otherness: New Approaches to the Experience of the Nazi Refugees. Oxford, 2005.
- Refuge and Reality: Feuchtwanger and the European Émigrés in California (with Pól Ó Dochartaigh). Amsterdam, 2005.
- Americanization and Anti-Americanism. The German Encounter with American Culture After 1945. New York, 2005, pb. 2007.
- Anna Seghers, Die Entscheidung. Roman. Werkausgabe, vol. I, 7. Berlin, 2003.
- Döblin, L. Feuchtwanger, A. Seghers, A. Zweig, Early 20th Century German Fiction. New York, 2003, pb. 2003.
- Jeans, Rock und Vietnam. Amerikanische Kultur in der DDR (with Therese Hörnigk). Berlin, 2002.
- ‘Rot = Braun’? Brecht Dialog 2000. Nationalsozialismus und Stalinismus bei Brecht und Zeitgenossen (with Therese Hörnigk). Berlin, 2000.
- Uwe Johnson, Speculations About Jakob and Other Writings. New York, 2000, pb. 2000.
- Themes and Structures. Studies in German Literature from Goethe to the Present. A Festschrift for Theodore Ziolkowski. Columbia, 1997.
- Ulrich Plenzdorf, Günter Kunert, Anna Seghers, and others, The New Sufferings of Young W. and Other Stories from the German Democratic Republic (with Therese Hörnigk). New York, 1997, pb. 1997.
- Christa Wolf: The Author’s Dimension. Selected Essays. New York and London, 1993; Chicago, 1995.
- Exil. Literatur und die Künste nach 1933. Bonn, 1990.
- Schreiben im Exil. Zur Ästhetik der deutschen Exilliteratur 1933-1945 (with Hans Wagener). Bonn, 1985.
- Peter Weiss. Die Ästhetik des Widerstands. Frankfurt, 1983, 2nd ed. 1987, 3rd ed. 1990.
- Editor of Exilstudien/Exile Studies. A Monograph Series. New York, Oxford, 1993ff. (vols. 1-10, vols. 11 in preparation).

TV and radio (selection):

- Left Behind: Popular culture, religiöser Fundamentalismus und Politik in den USA des George W. Bush, TV lecture, Germany, 2005.
- Thomas Mann und der CIA, TV documentary, Germany, 2002.
- Exilanten und der CIA, TV documentary, Germany, 2002.
- Brecht und das FBI, TV documentary, Germany, 2001.
- Im Visier des FBI. Deutsche Autoren im US-Exil, TV documentary (with Johannes Eglau), Germany, 1995.

== See also ==
- Communazi
