= Lorie Tarshis =

Canadian economist (1911-1993)

- Born: March 22, 1911; Toronto, Ontario, Canada
- Died: 4 October 1993 (aged 82); Toronto, Ontario, Canada
- Known for: first American university economics textbook of Keynesian economics

Academic background
- Education: University of Toronto; Trinity College, Cambridge
- Thesis: The Determinants of Labor Income (1939)
- Doctoral advisor: John Maynard Keynes

Academic work
- Institutions: Tufts University; Stanford University; University of Toronto Scarborough

Lorie Tarshis (22 March 1911 – 4 October 1993) was a Canadian economist who taught mostly at Stanford University. He is credited with writing the first introductory textbook that brought Keynesian thinking into American university classrooms, the 1947 Elements of Economics. The work swiftly lost popularity after it was charged with excessive sympathy to communism by McCarthyist activists. Instead, the 1948 Economics by Paul Samuelson brought the Keynesian Revolution to the United States.

== Education and career ==
Tarshis was born in Toronto and received a bachelor of commerce from the University of Toronto and master's and doctoral degrees in economics from Trinity College, Cambridge under the tutelage of John Maynard Keynes.

Tarshis came to the United States in 1936 as an instructor at Tufts University near Boston until 1939. He worked for the War Production Board in World War II and then became an operations analyst for the United States Army Air Forces at bomber commands in Libya, Tunisia and Italy. He returned to Tufts University in 1942 and continued teaching there until 1946.

Tarshis began teaching at Stanford in 1946, rising from assistant to associate to full professor. Later, he headed the department of economics at Stanford intermittently from 1950 to 1970. He then joined the faculty of Scarborough College, part of the University of Toronto system, and remained there until 1978 as a professor of economics. Until 1988 he was a professor and acting chairman of the department of economics at Glendon College, York University in Ontario. In his later years at Glendon College, he taught Intermediate Macroeconomics from his 1984 book, World Economy in Crisis: Unemployment, Inflation and International Debt.

== McCarthyite attack ==
In The Vital Center (1949), author Arthur M. Schlesinger, Jr. describes the attack on Tarshis:

The most recent textbook witch-hunt provides an edifying example. In August 1947, on the letterhead of an organization calling itself the National Economic Council, Inc., a man named Merwin K. Hart wrote to every member of the boards of trustees of colleges using Elements of Economics, an economic text written by Professor Lorie Tarshis of Stanford University. An enclosed review denounced the book for its exposition of the doctrines of Lord Keynes and identified Keynesianism as a form of Marxism.
Hart's letter had an immediate effect. Organizations of small businessmen passed resolutions in his support. Trustees and alumni wrote outraged letters to college presidents. Yet who was Merwin K. Hart? His record had been long known to students of the American proto-fascist demimonde...
Fortunately enough college presidents knew Hart's record to stand up courageously to the uproar... The American Economic Association eventually appointed a special committee to deal with the attacks on the Tarshis book and on other economic texts.

== Death ==
He died in a Toronto nursing home of Parkinson's disease at the age of 82.

== Selected bibliography ==
- Tarshis, Lorie (1959), "Factor inputs and international price comparisons", in Abramovitz, Moses; et al. (eds.), The allocation of economic resources: essays in honor of Bernard Francis Haley, Stanford, California: Stanford University Press, OCLC 490147128. ISBN 9780804705684.
- Tarshis, Lorie (1984), World Economy in Crisis: Unemployment, Inflation and International Debt, Toronto, Ontario: James Lorimer & Company, Publishers, ISBN 0-88862-626-6.
