= Post-war displacement of Keynesianism =

Economic doctrines changes in the late 1970s

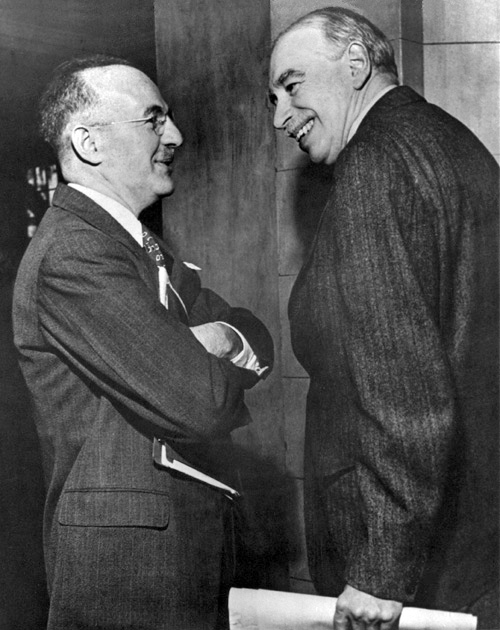
John Maynard Keynes (right) and Harry Dexter White at the Bretton Woods Conference in 1944

The post-war displacement of Keynesianism involved the replacement of Keynesian economics as the leading theoretical influence on economic life in the developed world. Similarly, the allied discipline known as development economics was largely displaced as the guiding influence on economic policies adopted by developing nations.

Significant departures of government policy from the previous Keynesian orthodoxy largely took place in the late 1970s and early 1980s. These shifts were preceded by efforts to discredit Keynes's economic ideas intellectually, which had taken place over several decades.

The displacement of Keynesian thinking was driven by those who leaned towards purer free market policies, rather than the mixed economy which require a significant role for government intervention. Their motivations included a dislike of large governments which they saw as prone to interfere excessively in the lives of their citizens; an intellectual preference for Classical or Neoclassical economics and related schools; or in some cases a belief that their individual interests were best served by promoting a limited role for government. Efforts against Keynesianism took place on three fronts – in the academic world, in politics, and in the wider world of business and public opinion.

== Background ==
Starting in 1936 with the publication of his General Theory, the Keynesian Revolution in economic thinking had by the end of the 1940s elevated John Maynard Keynes's ideas to an ascendant position in mainstream economics. The new post-WWII international monetary and trading system, reflected by embedded liberalism, was partly a creation of Keynes, and not just theoretically. Keynes had personally negotiated many of the practical details at the 1944 Bretton Woods Conference. During the Golden Age of Capitalism of the 1950s and 1960s, governments of the United States, United Kingdom and many other countries adopted Keynesian principles; moderate intervention by governments in their domestic economies was believed by Keynesians to deliver higher levels of employment and prosperity than would be possible from the unaided free market.

In the academic sphere, Keynes's position as the principal authority was largely confined to the Anglo-Saxon world; elsewhere Keynes was influential but not as central. This is partly because neoclassical economics, (Note: Keynes more commonly used the term 'classical economics' in his attacks, but it is widely accepted (e.g., Hayes, 2008, Edward Elgar publishing, The Economics of Keynes ISBN 978-1-84844-056-2 p 2) that he generally meant what we would now call neoclassical economics.) the system of thought which Keynes launched his revolution against, had never been firmly established beyond the English-speaking nations in the first place, where instead there was often a tradition of using mixed-economy models such as the French dirigiste system. While a critic of Keynes, the economic journalist Henry Hazlitt was to write in 1959:

Keynes has conquered the present Anglo-American academic world, and the present Western political world, almost as completely as Marx has conquered Russia and China.

Similarly, the economic policies adopted in the developing world were largely based on Development economics – although that branch of economics is usually regarded as distinct from Keynesianism, (Note: For very undeveloped countries it has been argued (e.g., by Subrata Ghutah, 2003, Routledge Introduction to development economics p39 - 43) that the economy behaves closer to the classical model than to Keynes's - as output tends to be very inelastic there is no multiplier effect from stimulus, and due to said elasticity along with money dualism (many preferring land or commodities like gold to the legal tender, especially when they wish to save) increases in the money supply tend to translate to price rises in the classical fashion as predicted by the Quantity theory of money.) it is also a mixed economy model with many of its principles based on Keynes's work. In the early years after WWII, the US was highly supportive of development economics as they believed it would help accelerate the rollback of imperialism, inhibit the spread of communism and swiftly help underdeveloped nations to become prosperous capitalist economies; so it heavily funded its promotion by United Nations programs. The only significant parts of the world that had rejected Keynesian principles were the communist nations which used the command economy model.

In the 1960s forces emerged that by the mid-80s would end the ascendency of Keynes's ideas. For Keynes's biographer Robert Skidelsky these can be divided into practical and intellectual dimensions; they are interrelated but in a complex and indirect way. The failure of what was at the time perceived to be Keynesian economics to halt the stagflation of the 1970s lent credibility both to academic and popular attacks on Keynes's ideas. Some even argued that the poor economic performance was due to Keynesian economics. The latter view has been roundly rejected by post keynesians, who suggest the inflation following the Vietnam war was due to the decision not to pay for the war with tax rises, against Keynesian advice. (Note: Though while war efforts were being escalated, the extent of war spending was hidden from President Johnson's Keynesian Economic Council, see The return to Keynes (2010), p29)

Economic historians have labelled the period from about 1951–1973 as the Age of Keynes or more commonly the Golden Age of Capitalism due to its relatively high average global growth, low unemployment, reduction of inequality, lowering of public debt and very low incidence of financial crises - based on these criteria, Anatole Kaletsky judged the Keynesian age to be the most successful era of capitalism so far. After the transition period of the 1970s, the period that spanned from about 1980–2009 has been labelled the Washington consensus era.

== The anti-Keynesian revolution ==
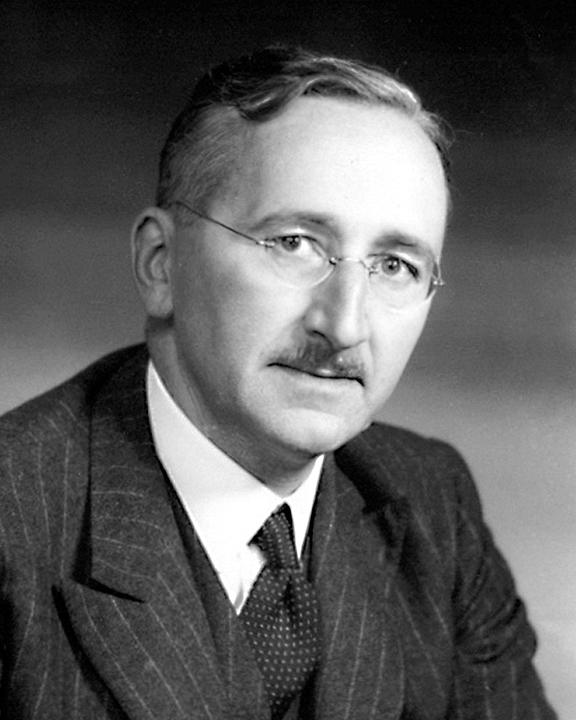
Keynes' friend and leading critic Friedrich von Hayek

As early as 1947, Friedrich von Hayek had gathered together some 40 intellectuals with free market sympathies to form the Mont Pelerin Society. (Note: Hayek had previously been involved in international resistance to Keynesianism and other forms of collectivist economic arrangements throughout the 1930s, attending for example the Colloque Walter Lippmann, which can be viewed as a forerunner of the Mont Pelerin Society. (see Cockett 1995, chpt 1)) They were mostly economists but also included journalists, historians and philosophers. Their explicit intention was to nurture intellectual currents that would one day displace Keynesianism and other collectivist influences. Prominent members included Karl Popper, Austrian School founder Ludwig von Mises along with the then young Milton Friedman. Initially the society had little impact on the wider world - Hayek was to say it was as if Keynes had been raised to sainthood after his death with economists refusing to allow his work to be questioned. Yet, in the decades following its establishment, the Mont Pelerin Society came to take a central role within a network of over 100 pro-free market think tanks located all over the world. (Note: A few of the free market think tanks pre-dated even the Mont Pelerin Society, most of them were founded in the 1970s or later.) The think tanks typically enjoyed financial support from commercial interests. Collectively the think tanks won increased acceptance for free market thinking within academia, within public opinion and among governments. In the U.S., two of the most influential free market think tanks are the Foundation for Economic Education and The Heritage Foundation. In the UK, the two most influential are the Institute of Economic Affairs and the Adam Smith Institute.

Hayek himself dropped out of mainstream economics in 1950 to work chiefly in political philosophy. Friedman and other allies continued to work as economists, though initially they only had marginal influence on the discipline as a whole.

According to Professor Keith Shaw an important early milestone in Friedman's campaign against Keynesianism was the 1956 publication of Studies in the Quantity Theory of Money. In this work Friedman restated the quantity theory of money, and obtained the attention of several Keynesian economists partly because he admitted Keynes was right to state that the velocity of circulation of money in the equation of exchange can vary, rather than being a constant as assumed by classical economists. However, Friedman's restatement was otherwise closer to the classical view in reducing the scope for beneficial government intervention in the economy. An even more influential work was his 1963 publication of A Monetary History of the United States. Drawing on extensive empirical data, it further strengthened the case for his restated quantity theory of money, arguing that inflation was "always and everywhere a monetary phenomenon", while conceding that it could take one or two years for an increase in the money supply to lead to inflation. This ran counter to the then orthodox Keynesian interpretation that inflation was linked to employment, as modelled by the Phillips curve which predicted an inverse relationship between the two variables. Governments at the time would use the Phillips curve as part of their models to calculate the expected cost in terms of inflation for a stimulus designed to restore full employment. In 1968 Milton Friedman published a paper arguing that the fixed relationship implied by the Philips curve did not exist, and that it would be possible to have both inflation and unemployment rise at once. (Note: Friedman had earlier made similar arguments verbally in his 1967 speech to the American Economic Association, where he had also first proposed his theory of the Natural rate of unemployment) Friedman had also argued that workers' expectations of future high inflation could lead to an inflationary spiral as they would push for increased wages in advance to try to compensate for expected future inflation.

Friedman's work began to gain increasing acceptance among academics after 1973, when stagflation - the simultaneous increase in both inflation and unemployment - became prominent, just as he had predicted. While the 1973 oil crisis was clearly an inflationary shock to the global economy, Friedman was able to argue persuasively that inflation was much higher than it would have been due to the rapid expansion of the money supply by governments in 1971. By the late 1970s, empirical data was also present to suggest that Friedman was right to emphasise the role of expectations on inflation, further increasing the acceptance of his ideas by mainstream economists. Post Keynesian economist Paul Davidson has argued that part of the reason for Friedman's intellectual victory was that Keynes' ideas were misunderstood by the mainstream academics of the time (the Neo-Keynesians) who therefore didn't have a consistent framework to rebut the attacks.

So prominent was Friedman in overturning the Keynesian consensus that the efforts to do so are sometimes referred to as "Milton Friedman's counter revolution." However, there were several other key influences. Professor Roger E Backhouse lists the Lucas critique which led to the increasing influence of Rational Expectations and Real Business Cycle Theory; Professor Gordon Fletcher identifies the same influences as Backhouse while also adding S H Frankel's attack which was based on the work of Georg Simmel along with the influence of the Austrian School and especially Hayek, who enjoyed a resurgence in the 1970s; Anatole Kaletsky again gives the same influences as Backhouse, saying the Policy Ineffectiveness Proposition was an especially significant statement of anti-Keynesian thinking. Journalist Adam Curtis describes how game theory and other ideas arising from the Cold War provided additional support for the theories Hayek had articulated in the 1940s, and helped them gain wider acceptance.

These attacks were so successful that by 1980 Robert Lucas was saying economists would often take offence if described as Keynesians.

== The ascendancy of financial-sector interests ==
When the Bretton Woods regime was established in the 1940s, free-roaming international capitalists were "caged". Capital controls were installed in all major countries. In Great Britain for example, at one point families were not allowed to take more than £50 abroad for their foreign holidays. Even before the controls were put in place, international transactions were at historically low levels, as financiers and speculators had been weakened or at least made wary by the long depression of the 1930s and the war.

Nevertheless, power slowly began to shift back from public to private interests. The 1970s were a key decade for this process, but financial innovation had begun to erode the effectiveness of capital controls as early as the late 1950s, an example being the Eurodollar market which the US authorities decided not to regulate.

Elliot and Atkinson state that 1968 was a pivotal year when power shifted in favour of private agents such as currency speculators. They pick out a key 1968 event as being when America suspended the conversion of the dollar into gold except on request of foreign governments, which they identify as when the Bretton Woods system Keynes had helped to design, first began to break down. Further key events were the Nixon Shock of 1971 when conversion to gold was suspended even for governments, the collapse of the fixed exchange rate system in 1973, and the United States official abandonment of capital controls in 1974.

A common popular view was that the rise of financial power resulted from unplanned trends towards globalisation and technical innovation. Reasons given include a calculation by the US that with the erosion of the hugely favorable trade balance they had enjoyed for the first few years after the war, financial liberation would be a good peaceful way of promoting continued US hegemony as US banks were far more advanced than their competitors in the rival economies of Europe and Japan. Another reason given is that the financial sector vigorously lobbied government to allow financial liberalization because it stood to gain hugely from it whereas the negative impact would be dispersed among all other sectors, with no one sector suffering greatly. So without a champion such as Keynes to stand up for the common good, a classic collective action problem prevented meaningful counter lobbying from occurring. (Note: In addition to Helleiner (1995) and the numerous sources he cites, see Great Transformations (2002) by Mark Blyth for more on how the US government was persuaded to support financial liberalisation. For a useful video documentary covering this topic, especially with relation to Britain but also the US see Adam Curtis's The Mayfair Set - Curtis covers additional aspects such as the increased power that markets gained after they were flooded with oil money following the 1973 price rise; and how in the 1960s the British government initially tolerated emergent phenomena such as corporate raiding as a possible solution to industrial inefficiency.) (Note: For more on the collective action problem and how after WWII it led to the decline of many institutions and laws set up to promote the common good, see The Rise and Decline of Nations (1984) by Mancur Olson. This book also briefly covers the other ways in which Keynesian economics had lost influence by the early 1980s.)

== Changes in public opinion ==
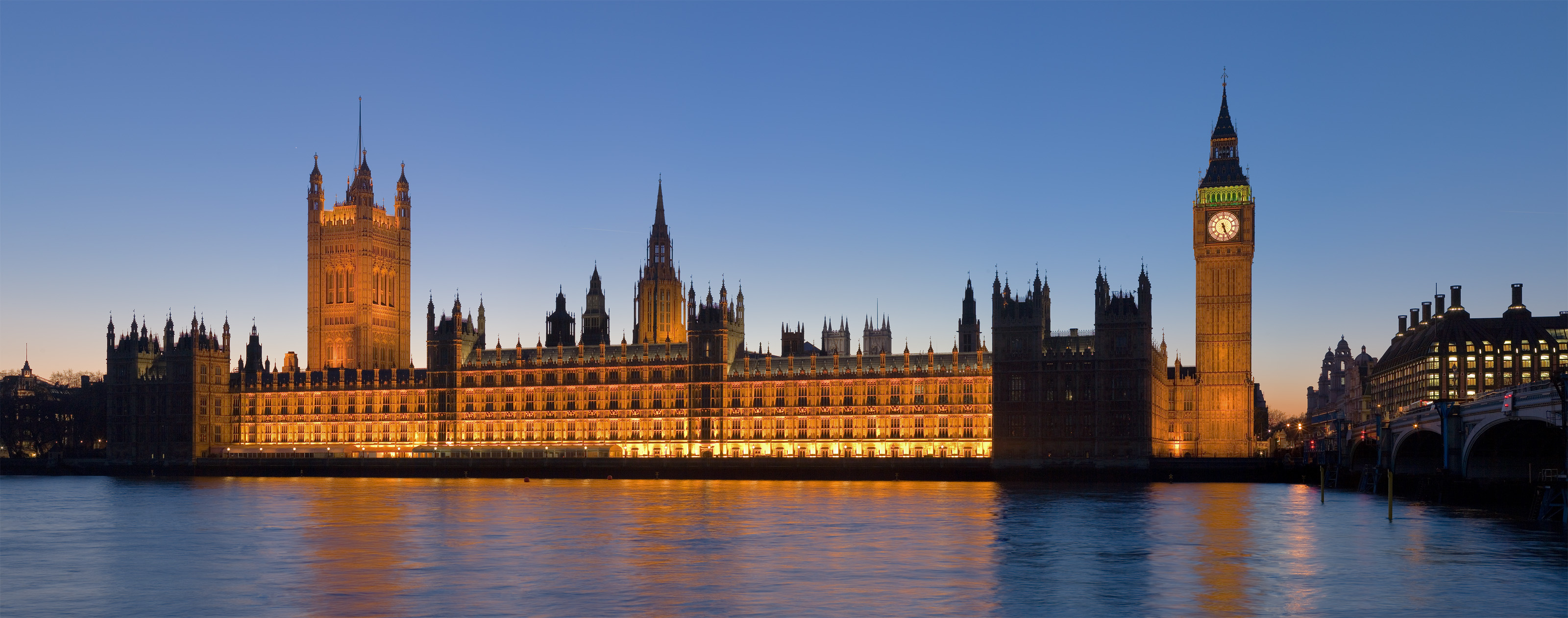
The Houses of Parliament (UK). Governments were generally viewed positively for the first two decades after World War II, but later, especially in English-speaking nations, the public began to take a more cynical view.

For most of the first two decades after World War II there was considerable enthusiasm among the public for Keynesian policy, which was seen as a way to avoid the economic chaos of the Great Depression. In Great Britain for example, the post-war election was fought largely on the grounds of the two main party's conflicting economic policies. Clement Attlee's Labour party espoused Keynesian policies, while Churchill's Conservative party drew considerable inspiration from Hayek and his then recently published The Road to Serfdom. The public's desire for Keynesian policy has been widely credited for the landside victory won by Attlee, despite the voters' great esteem for Churchill. The public was generally in favour of government efforts to enforce tight controls on private capital as public opinion was strongly against private speculators and financiers. Journalists Larry Elliott and Dan Atkinson say that it is hard for us today to imagine how dimly they were viewed. The disparaging label Gnomes of Zurich was typical of how they were described during this period.

Various events began to erode the public's faith in the goodness of government, gathering force from the mid-fifties. For Britain and her dominions a key event was the 1956 Suez Crisis along with strands of thought, such as the work of R.D. Laing in the counterculture and the thinking of Isaiah Berlin in mainstream academia, who to varying degrees were cynical of the Establishment's claims to want the best for folk, arguing that their true motivation was to advance their private interests or simply the thrill of exerting control. In the United States, Ayn Rand's popular novel Atlas Shrugged helped generate public enthusiasm for a return to laissez-faire capitalism—opinion polls have ranked her work as being the second most influential book on Americans after the Holy Bible. (Note: Though others have rated the book joint second in influence with To Kill a Mockingbird.)

Concerns over the true motivations of public officials were further encouraged by Public choice theory. A rudimentary form of this theory was promoted from the early 1960s by James Buchanan, at the expense of Keynes's standing both in public opinion and among academics. Journalists, Elliot and Atkinson, write that by the late sixties the younger generation had grown up with no experience of life before the managed economy, and therefore had no reason to be grateful to it. Instead they were skeptical about the Establishment's pretensions of altruism, in some cases hostile to what was perceived as its materialism and in other cases passionate for much more progressive causes. A notable worldwide eruption of these feelings caused the Protests of 1968. In the US, disenchantment at the Vietnam War and what was seen as the failure of Keynesian responses (Note: In his 2009 book The Keynes Solution Paul Davidson argues that the failing responses were not really Keynesian at all, but based on a misunderstanding of Keynes' ideas.) against inflation further contributed to the public's loss of faith in government. Buchanan and James Wanger's 1977 book Democracy in Deficit: the Political Legacy of Lord Keynes was one of the more effective attacks against remaining pro-Keynes opinion. A follow-up book, The Consequences of Mr Keynes, (1978) by Buchanan and John Burton, further attacked Keynes for his alleged naivete in believing that politicians and bureaucrats are largely motivated by benevolence. This is not to say the public as a whole became positive about the free market. During the seventies those advocating its principles would still sometimes be pelted with eggs and flour bombs by hostile student audiences. However public opinion in the English-speaking world was slowly won over. By the eighties free market institutions were once again widely respected if not widely admired, despite the occasional popular work that tried to bring their dark side to the public's attention, such as Oliver Stone's film Wall Street and Tom Wolfe's novel The Bonfire of the Vanities.

== Labour militancy ==
Labour unrest and aggressive wage bargaining was a significant cause of the displacement especially in Britain but also in the United States. For about the first 15 years of the Keynesian age, labour relations were generally peaceful. But by the late 1960s, labour unions became increasingly militant in pushing for wage increases. As had been predicted by Michał Kalecki in 1943, this resulted from the very success of Keynesian policy in reducing unemployment: an increasingly large proportion of workers had no fear of joblessness as they were too young to remember the pre-war years. Workers were initially successful in improving their pay and conditions. But from the late 1960s onwards, large wage increases had contributed significantly to inflation in the U.S., U.K. and Europe. By about the mid-1970s, British workers had achieved a record share of industrial output to be paid as wages rather than being returned to capital – but this contributed to capital flight from Great Britain. By 1980, the disruption caused to British society by the previous decade's frequent striking, especially in the Winter of Discontent, had contributed to public support for the anti-Keynesian programme of the Thatcher administration.

== Shifts in government policy ==
For the Anglo-American economies, Keynesian economics typically was not officially rejected until the late 1970s or early 1980s. Formal rejection was generally preceded by several years of the adoption of monetarist policies aiming to reduce inflation, which tended to counteract any expansionary fiscal policies that continued to be employed until Keynesianism was formally discarded. In Britain Keynesian economics was officially rejected by Margaret Thatcher's new government in 1979, ending the Post-war consensus. There had been initial unsuccessful attempts to establish free market favouring policies as early as 1970 by the government of Edward Heath. In 1976, market participants began speculating against the pound, even though at the time both inflation and Britain's Balance of payments position was improving. Eric Helleiner cites a number of sources to suggest the speculation related to the growing influence of Monetarism and opposition to Keynesian policy by the increasing powerful market players. After suffering a currency crises, Britain needed to turn to the IMF. The IMF was now much less Keynesian than it had been in previous years, and only agreed to provide the required financing if Britain agreed to implement an austerity package. Shortly after, the then Prime Minister, James Callaghan, stated that "spending our way out of recession" is no longer an option. According to Skidelsky, Callaghan's statement is widely seen as marking the end of the Keynesian age. In the US it was Reaganomics that fully displaced Keynesianism in 1981, again this had been preceded by a significant movement in the direction of monetarism by President Jimmy Carter's 1979 appointment of Paul Volcker as Chairman of the Federal Reserve. In Australia and New Zealand the era of Keynesianism was ended by the election victories of prime ministers Bob Hawke (1983) and David Lange (1984) respectively, though in both cases Keynesian economics had already to some extent fallen out of favour.

In Canada the transition was less clearly marked, though Pierre Trudeau had begun to adopt monetarist anti-inflationary measures as early as 1975. Likewise for most of continental Europe except for France, the transition away from Keynesian economics was less distinct, partly as Keynes had not been as important there, since European states had generally pursued Dirigiste measures even before Keynes, never having embraced classical economics in the first place. In France, François Mitterrand came to power in 1981 with a commitment to expansionary Keynesian policy, to help reduce unemployment caused by the worldwide recession underway at the time. Similar to what had happened after Léon Blum's election back in 1936, many of the wealthy moved their money out of France, and by 1983 Mitterrand had been forced to largely abandon Keynesian policy.

In South America, efforts were made to displace development economics as early as the mid fifties, by Milton Friedman's Chicago School. There had been some US government support, as it appeared there was a risk that the developmentalist policies could encourage socialism . However, despite success in setting up franchises in Latin American universities and educating passionate individual free market economists, the efforts had little political effect. However, later events such as the 1973 coup by Augusto Pinochet in Chile brought in governments who strongly favoured free market policies. In other Latin American countries pivotal individual events are much harder to pin down, but a gradual process described by author Duncan Green as a "silent revolution" had largely displaced development economics with free market influences by the mid 1980s

In the developing countries of Africa and Asia, the mid seventies saw a backlash against the trend towards liberalism by the west, with a group of some 77 developing nations making determined efforts to lobby for a revived Bretton Woods system with strengthened capital controls to protect against adverse movements of private finance. But again commitment to development economics largely faded away and by the mid 1980s the free market agenda was broadly accepted. Exceptions were countries large enough to retain independence and continue to employ mixed economy policies, such as India and China. China employed a command economy model throughout the 1950s and 60s but the reform and opening up in China began in 1978 taking them closer to a mixed economy model, though one based more on pragmatic principles rather than specifically on Keynes's ideas. India persisted with heavily interventionist policies until the early 1990s, when it began to liberalize after its 1991 crisis, though still retaining aspects of the mixed economy model such as extensive use of capital controls.

== See also ==
- Neoclassical synthesis
- Neoclassical economics
- History of economic thought
- Global financial system
- International political economy
- The Commanding Heights
- 2008–2009 Keynesian resurgence
