= Red fascism =

Term equating forms of Marxism–Leninism with fascism

Red fascism is a concept equating Stalinism and other variants of Marxism–Leninism or communism in general with fascism. As a term, it dates back to the 1920s and was originally used by left-wing individuals who were critics of Bolshevism; by the 1940s and the Cold War era, particularly in the United States, it was adapted as an anti-communist slogan within the framework of totalitarianism. Since the 1990s, the concept of red fascism began to overlap with that of red–brownism. Others associated it with red–green–brown alliances, "left-wing fascism" and the regressive left, and Islamofascism.

In the early 20th century, the original Italian fascists initially claimed to be "neither left-wing nor right-wing"; by 1921, they began to identify themselves as the "extreme right", and their founder Benito Mussolini explicitly affirmed that fascism is opposed to socialism and other left-wing ideologies. Accusations that the leaders of the Soviet Union during the Stalin era acted as "red fascists" have come from left-wing figures who identified as anarchists, left communists, left-wing nationalists, social democrats, and other democratic socialists, as well as liberals and among right-wing circles both closer to and further from the political centre. The comparison of Nazism and Stalinism is controversial in academia.

== History ==
=== Anti-Stalinist left origins ===
Use of the term "red fascist" was first recorded in the early 1920s, in the aftermath of both the Russian Revolution and the March on Rome. For instance, the Italian anarchist Luigi Fabbri wrote in 1922 that "red fascists" is "the name that had been given to those Bolshevik communists who are most inclined to espouse fascism's methods for use against their adversaries". In the following years, other socialists began to believe and argue that the Soviet government was becoming a red fascist state. Bruno Rizzi, an Italian Marxist and a founder of the Communist Party of Italy who became an anti-Stalinist, argued in 1938 that "Stalinism [took on] a regressive course, generating a species of red fascism identical in its superstructural and choreographic features [with its fascist model]."

While primarily focused on critiquing Nazism, the Austrian Freudo-Marxist psychoanalyst Wilhelm Reich considered the Soviet Union under Joseph Stalin to have developed into red fascism. The term is often attributed to the Austrian historian and sociologist Franz Borkenau, another Freudo-Marxist, former communist, and anti-Stalinist socialist who was a key proponent of the theory of totalitarianism, which posits that there are certain essential similarities between fascism and Stalinism. Borkenau used the term in 1939.

Otto Rühle, a German Marxist and left communist in the council communist tradition who also came close to anarchist positions, wrote that "the struggle against fascism must begin with the struggle against Bolshevism", adding that he believed the Soviets had influence on fascist states by serving as a model. In 1939, Rühle further professed: "Russia was the example for fascism. ... Whether party 'communists' like it or not, the fact remains that the state order and rule in Russia are indistinguishable from those in Italy and Germany. Essentially they are alike. One may speak of a red, black, or brown 'soviet state', as well as of red, black or brown fascism."

Kurt Schumacher, a member of the Social Democratic Party of Germany (SPD) who was imprisoned in Nazi concentration camps but survived World War II to become the first post-war SPD opposition leader in West Germany, described pro-Soviet communists as "red-painted fascists" or "red-lacquered Nazis". Similarly, the exiled Russian anarchist Volin, who saw the Soviet state as totalitarian and as an "example of integral state capitalism", used the term "red fascism" to describe it. In the United States, Norman Thomas (a democratic socialist who ran for president numerous times under the Socialist Party of America banner), accused the Soviet Union in the 1940s of decaying into red fascism by writing: "Such is the logic of totalitarianism ... [that] communism, whatever it was originally, is today red fascism." In the same period, the term was used by the New York Intellectuals, who were left-wing but sided against the Soviet Union in the developing Cold War.

The Spanish writer Agustin Guillamón, citing the Spanish Trotskyist Grandizo Munis, wrote that "Stalinism, always and everywhere, has led and directed the counterrevolutionary forces, deriving its power from the idea of national unity, the practice of a policy of law and order, its struggle to establish a strong government, an economic policy based on nationalization, the infiltration of the militants of the Stalinist party into the state apparatus, and especially disguising its reactionary nature in the midst of the workers movement." Having its origins in Marxism-Leninism, Stalinism is oriented around nationalization, but is identified as counterrevolutionary, similar to how fascist movements in Italy and Germany appropriated socialist movements in their own countries in order to consolidate an authoritarian state.

=== In the political mainstream during the Cold War ===
In the United States during and leading up to the Cold War, "red fascism" was used as an anti-communist slogan juxtaposing that Nazism and Stalinism were almost identical totalitarian systems. In a 18 September 1939 editorial, The New York Times reacted to the signing of the Molotov–Ribbentrop Pact by declaring that "Hitlerism is brown communism, Stalinism is red fascism." The editorial further opined: "The world will now understand that the only real 'ideological' issue is one between democracy, liberty and peace on the one hand and despotism, terror and war on the other."

In 1946, J. Edgar Hoover, the director of the FBI, gave a speech in which he said: "Hitler, Tojo, and Mussolini brands of Fascism were met and defeated on the battle field. All those who stand for the American way of life must arise and defeat Red Fascism in America by focusing upon it the spotlight of public opinion and by building up barriers of common decency through which it cannot penetrate." The speech was reprinted in December 1946 in the Washington News Digest, and Hoover also entitled an article "Red Fascism in the United States Today" in The American Magazine in February 1947.

Also in 1946, Ukrainian writer Ivan Bahrianyi published Why I Am Not Going Back to the Soviet Union. In the pamphlet, he wrote about the Holodomor, repressions of Ukrainian intelligentsia, Soviet policy of Russification, and conception of the Soviet people. During the World War II years, he had worked in the Organisation of Ukrainian Nationalists (OUN) propaganda sector and later in 1948 would found the Ukrainian Revolutionary Democratic Party. Just like the OUN-M spoke of "millions of victims who perished at the criminal hands of the red and black totalisms", Bahrianyi argued that Ukrainians had fought "the two last totalitarian antidemocratic systems", and wrote: "A characteristic feature of the entire population of Ukraine is a colossal, repressed, but implacable hatred for the Bolshevik totalitarian regime, on the one hand, and for fascism in all its manifestation, even the memory of it, on the other."

Тим терором російський червоний фашизм (більшовизм) намагається перетворити 100 національностей в т.зв. "єдиний радянський народ", цебто фактично в російський народ.
With this terror, Russian red fascism (Bolshevism) is trying to turn 100 ethnic groups into the so-called "single Soviet people," that is, in fact, the Russian people.

— Ivan Bahrianyi, 1946

Jack Tenney, an anti-communist politician who chaired the California Senate Factfinding Subcommittee on Un-American Activities, published in 1947 a report entitled Red Fascism: Boring from Within, by the Subversive Forces of Communism, which drew on the popular anti-fascism of the war years to portray the Soviet Union and Communism as similar to the Nazis; he also associated progressives with fascism and Communism, claiming the progressive policies supported by the American Left to be fascist. Although they did not share this latter point, Cold War liberals identified fascism as a totalitarianism that was common to both Nazi Germany and the Soviet Union. This new definition of fascism replaced the notable one given by Carey McWilliams where fascism was defined by political repression, class inequalities, and racism.

Also in 1947, at the beginning of the Second Red Scare, politicians across the two main political parties like Senator Everett Dirksen (a moderate Republican who supported much of the New Deal before becoming more conservative and isolationist but supported American involvement in World War II) and Representative Henderson L. Lanham (a Southern Democrat and staunch segregationist) used the term. Dirksen's speech was reprinted in Vital Speeches of the Day in April 1947 under the title "Red Fascism: Freedom Is in Jeopardy". In the speech, like Tenney did in his report, Dirksen warned of widespread Communist infiltration, including into the federal government, the film industry, labor unions, and educational systems; he also praised the work of the House Un-American Activities Committee. Lanham stated that the Greek and Turkish Assistance Act of 1947 (the first of many foreign policy initiatives created through the Truman Doctrine) was useful in fighting the spread of "Red fascism".

=== Post-Cold War and contemporary ===
Bernard-Henri Lévy, a French philosopher and journalist, used "red fascism" in arguing that some European intellectuals have been infatuated with anti-Enlightenment theories and embraced a new absolutist ideology, one that is anti-liberal, anti-American, anti-imperialist, antisemitic, and pro-Islamofascist. In academic terms, "red–brownism" refers to the ideological convergence, emerging in the post-Soviet era and continuing to develop into the 21st century, among thinkers from European nationalist movements, Russian Marxist–Leninism, and the New Right. This movement has established red–brownism as a political opposition to capitalism, liberal democracy, the American way of life, and Western unipolarity, with strong Eurasianist undertones. In contemporary discourse, it is increasingly taking shape as a hub of dissent.

Modern Antifa movements are often described in similar terms to red fascists, due to their predilection for black shirts and political violence, which to an outsider looks little different to the violent fascist groups of post-war Europe.

== See also ==
- Beefsteak Nazi, leftists who joined the Nazi Party
- Communazi, portmanteau of communist and Nazi
- Communist terrorism
- Definitions of fascism, theories about the phenomenon of fascism
- German–Soviet Axis talks, 1940 negotiations for Soviet entry as a fourth Axis power in World War II
- Fascism and ideology, history of fascist ideology
- Feudal fascism, term used to describe Maoist China
- Horseshoe theory, posited similarity of the far left and far right
- Juche
- Liberal Fascism, 2008 book that argues fascist movements are left-wing
- National Bolshevism, ideology combining Bolshevik communism with ultranationalism
- Neosocialism, a 1930s political faction in Belgium and France
- Red-baiting, logical fallacy
- Social fascism, communist term for social democracy in the 1930s
- Strasserism, revolutionary strand of Nazism
- Tankie, pejorative term for authoritarian communists

== Bibliography ==
- Nazism and the working class in Austria : industrial unrest and political dissent in the "national community"
