= Harold Lord Varney =

American editor (1893–1984)

Harold Lord Varney (1893–1984) was an American author.

Varney was an editor at The Awakener and The American Mercury. He was a member of the IWW, of which he wrote the account Revolt. Later he moved in the direction of fascism.

After the war he was a contributor to American Opinion and headed a pro-Panama committee.

Varney was friends with Joseph P. Kamp, who was his executive editor for The Awakener.
