= The Awakener =

The Awakener was an American right-wing anti-New Deal anti-labor newspaper.

It was founded in 1934 by Harold Lord Varney and included as editors Lawrence Dennis, Joseph P. Kamp, and Milford W. Howard. Dennis removed himself from the publication in 1935. The publication distanced itself from fascism by saying, "The Awakener has long been apprehensive that the planless and irresponsible economic experiments which the Roosevelt Administration is carrying out will reduce our national life to such hopeless social disorder that Fascism may be invoked by American conservatives as a last desperate expedient to save the country from Communist revolution. We deplore such a possibility."

Harold Lord Varney was, for some time after the World War II, an editor of The American Mercury.
