= National Economic Council, Inc. =

Conservative American political organization

National Economic Council, Inc. was an American conservative political organization, headed for much of its history by Merwin K. Hart.

The organization was established in 1931 as the New York State Economic Council, with the aims of reducing U.S. government expenditures and taxes. In 1943, it changed its name to the National Economic Council.

Positions of the New York State Economic Council and the National Economic Council, Inc., included opposition to U.S. President Franklin Roosevelt and support for Francisco Franco's fascist leadership in Spain. Several newsletters of the National Economic Council expressed antisemitic views, stating that American Jews were "alien-minded" and were undermining American government through "deceit", "trickery", and "intimidation". In 1947, the organization sent letters to many trustees of American universities and colleges that attacked Keynesian economics as a form of Marxism and denounced the textbook Elements of Economics, by Lorie Tarshis, for endorsing Keynesianism. The organization also opposed the civil rights movement and linked it to communism.

Notable writers affiliated with the National Economic Council included Rose Wilder Lane, daughter of Laura Ingalls Wilder. One of the seminal influencers of the mid-20th Century Libertarian political movement, Lane served as an editor and book reviewer from 1945-1952.

The organization was included on President Richard Nixon's "enemies list".

== See also ==
- Merwin K. Hart
- Rose Wilder Lane
