= National Committee to Uphold Constitutional Government =

Anti-New Deal political organization

The National Committee to Uphold Constitutional Government (NCUCG), also known as the Committee for Constitutional Government (CCG), was founded in 1937 in opposition to Franklin D. Roosevelt's Court Packing Bill. The Committee opposed most, if not all, of the New Deal legislation.

Founders of the Committee were Frank Gannett, Amos Pinchot and Edward Rumely. The organization enjoyed considerable success in opposing the Bill, also because of large mailing list campaign targeted at legal professionals.

Pinchot would later lead an America First chapter in New York City, although the committee itself was silent on the foreign policies of Roosevelt, and included many interventionists as its members. Gannett would become a presidential candidate in 1940.

Other people associated with the Committee were U.S. Representative Samuel B. Pettengill, John M. Pratt, Ralph W. Gwinn, John T. Flynn and Robert E. Wood.

The Committee was thrice investigated by Congress for suspected lobbying activities. Most notably, Rumely was twice indicted for Contempt of Congress. In 1946, he was acquitted in the second Congressional investigation. In 1953, he was cleared in the third Congressional investigation, a case he pleaded all the way to the United States Supreme Court on appeal.

== See also ==
- Merwin K. Hart (National Economic Council)
