= Milford W. Howard =

American politician

Milford Wriarson Howard
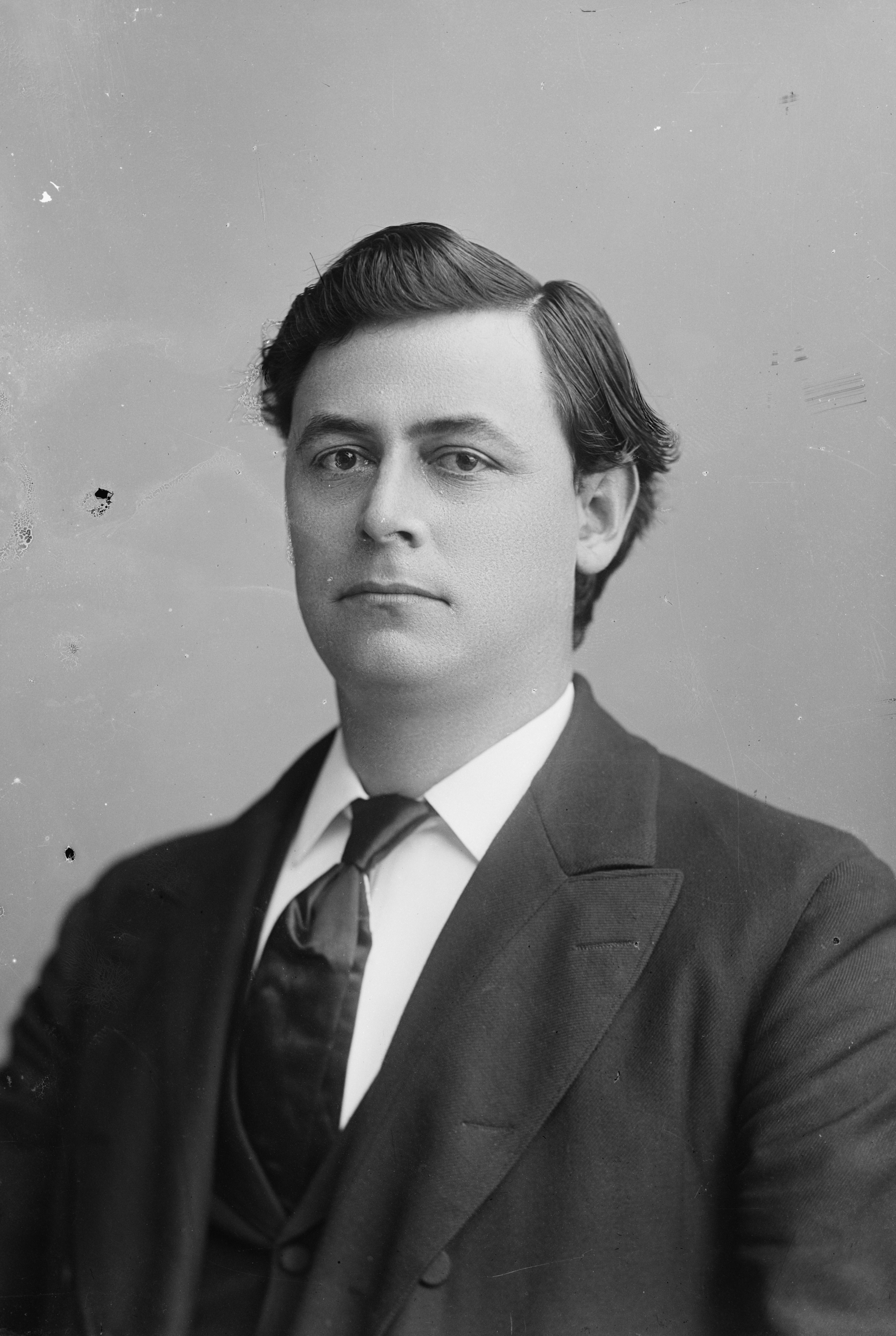
- Portrait c. 1895–1899

Member of the U.S. House of Representatives from Alabama's Alabama's 7th congressional district district
- In office March 4, 1895 – March 3, 1899
- Preceded by: William Henry Denson
- Succeeded by: John L. Burnett

Personal details
- Born: December 18, 1862 Rome, Georgia, US
- Died: December 28, 1937 (aged 75) Los Angeles, California, US
- Party: Populist
- Spouse: Sallie

Milford Wriarson Howard (December 18, 1862 – December 28, 1937) was a United States representative from Alabama.

Howard was first elected to the House of Representatives as a Populist in 1894, defeating incumbent William H. Denson. He was reelected in 1896 in a three-way race, although he won only 35.8% of the vote. He did not seek another term in 1898. He was the last Populist to hold Congressional office from Alabama. Howard returned to his hometown of Fort Payne, Alabama to practice law. In 1908, his name was put into nomination for the presidency at the first convention of the Independence Party in Chicago, but he finished third in the balloting to Thomas L. Hisgen.

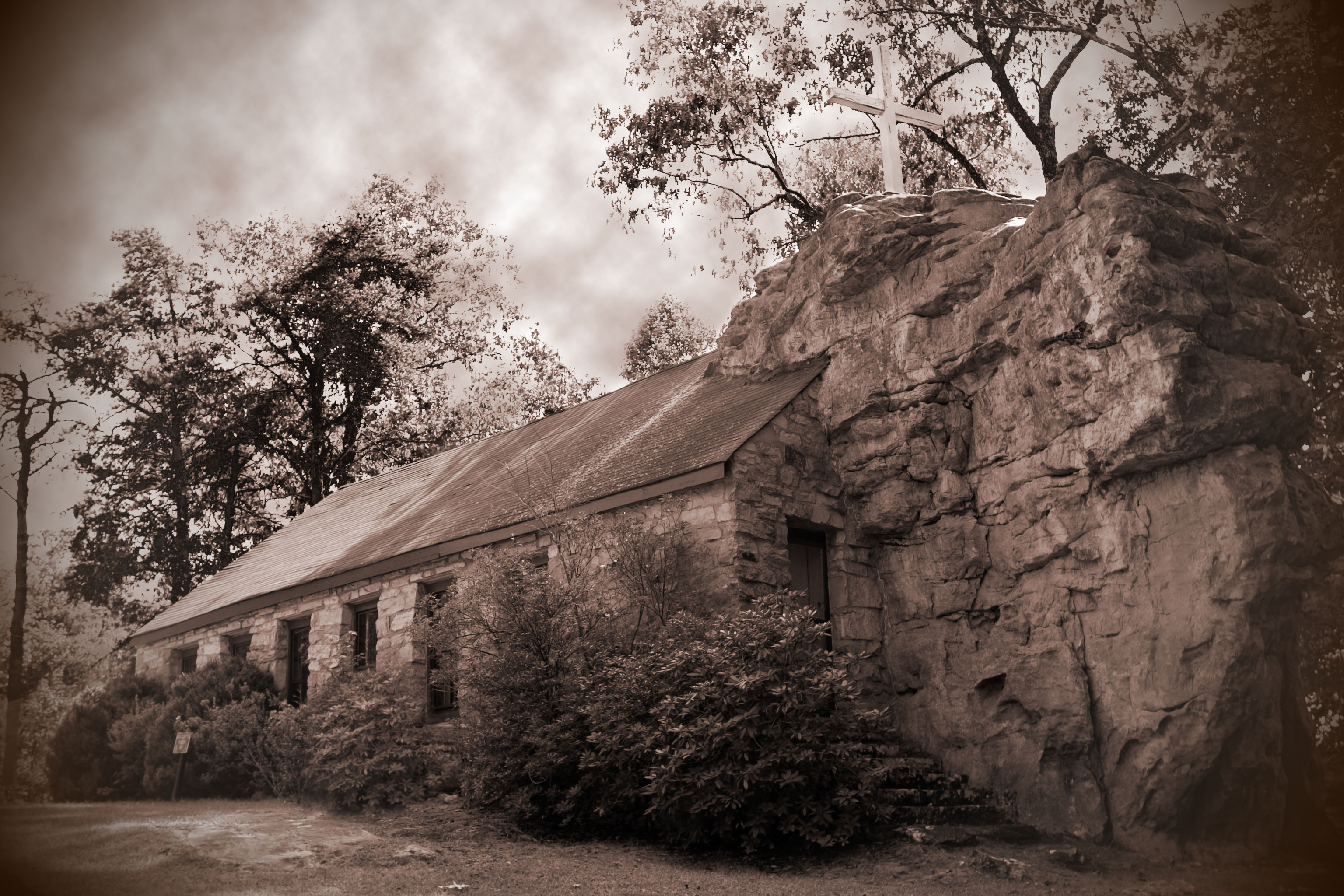
Sallie Howard Chapel (1937), near Mentone, Alabama: interment site of Milford W. Howard

He moved to California in 1918 to pursue literary efforts and worked briefly in the silent movie business. Meeting with Benito Mussolini in the late 1920s, Howard would become a committed fascist for the rest of his life. In 1934, he was one of the editors of The Awakener. Following his death in Los Angeles, his cremated remains were interred, along with those of his first wife, in a large rock, into which the Sallie Howard Chapel, a memorial to his first wife near Mentone, Alabama, was built.

== See also ==
- The Bishop of the Ozarks

U.S. House of Representatives
Preceded by William H. Denson	Member of the U.S. House of Representatives from Alabama's 7th congressional district March 4, 1895 – March 3, 1899	Succeeded by John L. Burnett
