= Lawrence Dennis =

American political philosopher

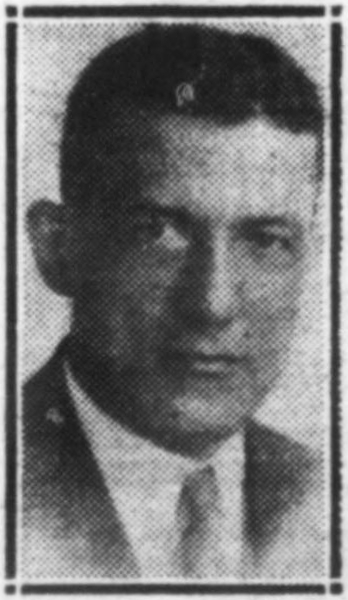
- Dennis c. 1934
- Born: December 25, 1893; Atlanta, Georgia, U.S.
- Died: August 20, 1977 (aged 83); Spring Valley, New York, U.S.
- Education: Harvard University (BA)

Lawrence Dennis (December 25, 1893 – August 20, 1977) was an American diplomat, consultant, and author. He advocated fascism in America after the Great Depression, arguing that liberal capitalism was doomed and one-party planning of the economy was essential.

== Early life ==
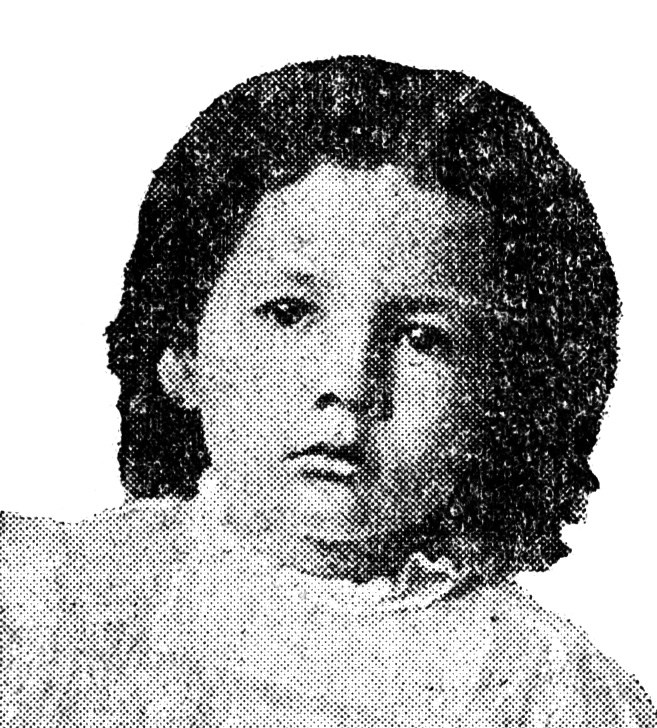
Lawrence Dennis as a child evangelist c. 1899

Dennis was born in Atlanta, Georgia. He was of mixed race (his mother was African American and his father's race was unknown), but he concealed that as a teenager and instead passed as a white man until his death—even his wife and daughters did not know. He was fluent in English, French, and German. Following a notable career as a child evangelist, he was sent to Phillips Exeter Academy, which he graduated from in 1915, and then to Harvard University, which he graduated from in 1920. In between, he briefly served as a junior officer in the American Expeditionary Force in France.

During World War I, Dennis commanded a company of military police in France. He graduated from Harvard in 1920 and entered the diplomatic service. He was first posted in Bucharest, Romania. The Romanian government awarded him the Order of the Star of Romania. The highest rank he achieved as a diplomat was that of a chargé d'affaires.

The turning point of his life came when he served in Nicaragua. He resigned from the foreign service in disgust at the U.S. intervention there against Sandino's rebellion, also complaining of a nepotistic and non-meritocratic promotion system. He then became an adviser to the Latin American fund of the Seligman banking trust, but he again made enemies when he wrote a series of exposés of their foreign bond enterprises in The New Republic and The Nation in 1930. The exposés propelled Dennis into a national public intellectual career, publishing his first book at the height of the depression in 1932, Is Capitalism Doomed? The book submitted that capitalism was and should be on its death knell, but it warned of the grave dangers of a world devoid of its positive legacy.

He married Eleanor Melisande Brunnhilde Simson, who had Jewish ancestry, in 1933, and they lived together in the Berkshires, Massachusetts. In letters to him, she expressed admiration for the strong gender roles in Germany.

== Views on fascism ==
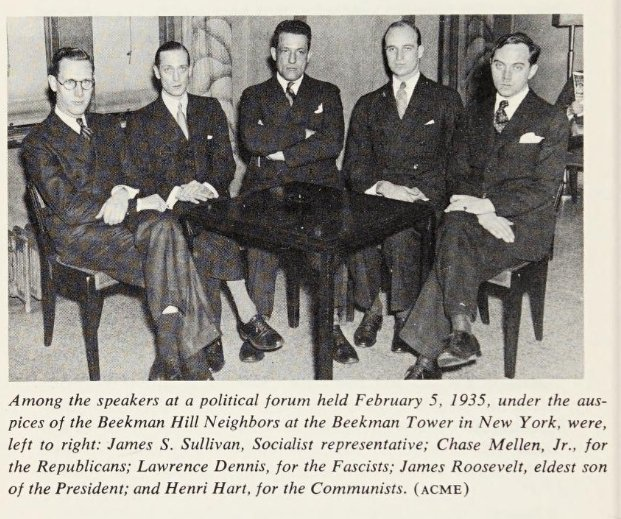
From left to right: James S. Sullivan, Chase Mellen Jr., Lawrence Dennis, James Roosevelt, Henri Hart

His two later books detailed his sense of the system that was emerging to replace capitalism, which he believed to be fascism. The Coming American Fascism in 1936, detailing the system's substructure, and The Dynamics of War and Revolution in 1940, on the superstructure. Dennis argued that he was merely examining fascism and predicting its coming to the U.S., not actually advocating it. His readers and associates assumed he was indeed an advocate. He never tried to create or join a fascist party.

He viewed Hitler as unimpressive and reliant on political showmanship, preferring more intellectual Nazis such as Joseph Goebbels, Alfred Rosenberg, Rudolf Hess, and Hermann Göring. He criticized Nazis' overt anti-Semitism, though seemingly more as a matter of strategy and optics than of genuine anti-bigotry beliefs.

In 1941, Life called Dennis "America's No. 1 intellectual Fascist." In her 2023 book, Prequel, Rachel Maddow wrote of Dennis's visit to Nuremberg for the 4th annual Nazi party congress on September 8, 1936, "Dennis's biographer, Gerald Horne, would later write 'America's most outspoken fascist symbolically melted into the Nazi mass.'"

He was an isolationist, and therefore expressed staunch opposition to American involvement in a war against Nazi Germany.

Dennis was an editor at The Awakener for some time. Later, he founded his own publication, the Weekly Foreign Letter, and he wrote for Today's Challenge, published by the pro-German American Fellowship Forum of George Sylvester Viereck and Friedrich Ernst Ferdinand Auhagen (b. 1899). He tried to join the U.S. Army during World War II, but the Army rejected him after the media ran stories about him.

He often described himself as rational and unemotional. Anne Morrow Lindbergh strongly disagreed, describing him as "sensitive" and having "been badly hurt."

== Sedition trial ==
In 1944, he was indicted in a group that ranged from isolationists to pro-Nazi agitators, in a sedition prosecution under the Smith Act. After seven months of proceedings the case ended in a mistrial, after presiding judge Edward C. Eicher died of a heart attack in November 1944. Dennis co-authored with Maximilian John St. George (1885–1959) an account of the trial, which appeared in 1946 as A Trial on Trial: The Great Sedition Trial of 1944.

== Later life ==
In his later years, Dennis repudiated his views of the 1930s and early 1940s, became a critic of militarism and the Cold War, and he propagated his views through a modest newsletter, The Appeal to Reason (not to be confused with the similar named Appeal to Reason, a left-wing newspaper published in the American Midwest from 1895 until 1922), which maintained a prominent circle of readers, including Herbert Hoover, Joseph P. Kennedy, William Appleman Williams, Harry Elmer Barnes, and James J. Martin. His last book, Operational Thinking for Survival, was published in 1969.

Posthumously, his works were reprinted by the far-right Noontide Press. Holocaust denial writer Keith Stimely also expressed an interest in his life, and wrote an essay on him. Alec Marsh suggests that, "Dennis will find his place in the disenchanted anti-liberal black company of Thomas Sowell, Clarence Thomas, and George Schuyler."

== Books ==
- Is Capitalism Doomed? (Harper & Brothers, 1932)
- The Coming American Fascism (Harper & Brothers, 1936) online
- The Dynamics of War and Revolution (Harper & Brothers, 1940)
- A Trial on Trial: The Great Sedition Trial of 1944 (1946)
- Operational Thinking for Survival (Ralph Myles, 1969)
