= Economics (textbook) =

1948 textbook by Samuelson and Nordhaus

- Author: Paul Samuelson
- Language: English
- Subject: Economics
- Published: McGraw-Hill
- Publication date: 1948

Economics (Economics: An Introductory Analysis in later editions) is an introductory textbook by American economists Paul Samuelson and William Nordhaus. The textbook was first published in 1948, and has appeared in nineteen different editions, the most recent in 2009. It was the bestselling economics textbook for many decades and still remains popular, selling over 300,000 copies of each edition from 1961 through 1976. The book has been translated into forty-one languages and in total has sold over four million copies.

Economics was written entirely by Samuelson until the 12th edition (2001). Newer editions have been revised with others, including Nordhaus for the 17th edition (2001) and afterwards.

== Influence ==
Economics has been called a "canonical textbook", and the development of mainstream economic thought has been traced by comparing the fourteen editions under Samuelson's editing.

Economics coined the term "neoclassical synthesis" and popularized the concept, bringing a mix of neoclassical economics and Keynesian economics and helping make this the leading school in mainstream economics in the United States and globally in the second half of the 20th century.

It popularized the term paradox of thrift, and attributed the concept to Keynes, though Keynes himself attributed it to earlier authors, and forms of the concept date to antiquity.

The 1958 text introduced a "family tree of economics", which by the 20th century consisted of only two groupings, "socialism", listing Marx and Lenin, and the "neo-classical synthesis", listing Marshall and Keynes. This paralleled the then-extant Cold War economies of Soviet communism and American capitalism. This advanced a simplified view of the vying schools of economic thought, subsuming schools which considered themselves distinct, and today many within and without economics equate "economics" with "neo-classical economics", following Samuelson. Later editions provided expanded coverage of other schools, such as the Austrian school, Institutionalism, and Marxian economics.

== Reception ==
Economics was the second Keynesian textbook in the United States, following the 1947 The Elements of Economics, by Lorie Tarshis. Like Tarshis's work, Economics was attacked by American conservatives (as part of the Second Red Scare, or McCarthyism), universities that adopted it were subject to "conservative business pressuring", and Samuelson was accused of communism. Nonetheless, Economics proved successful and remained widely adopted. The success of Samuelson's text, compared with Tarshis's, which was subject to more "virulen[t]" attacks, is attributed to various factors, notably Samuelson's dispassionate, scientific style, in contrast to Tarshis's more engaged style, and subsequent texts have followed Samuelson's style. Accusations by conservatives of communist sympathies in Economics continued into the 1980s.

== See also ==
- Principles of Economics, a similarly influential earlier textbook by Alfred Marshall, first published in 1890.
