= The Vital Center =

1949 book by Arthur M. Schlesinger jr.

The Vital Center: The Politics of Freedom
- First edition
- Author: Arthur Schlesinger, Jr.
- Cover artist: Samuel Hanks Bryant
- Language: English
- Genre: Non-fiction
- Publisher: Houghton Mifflin
- Publication date: 1948
- Publication place: United States

The Vital Center: The Politics of Freedom is a 1949 book by Harvard historian Arthur Schlesinger, Jr. It defends liberal democracy and a state-regulated market economy against the totalitarianism of communism and fascism.

== Summary ==
Schlesinger's argument runs as follows: modern man has been detached from his moorings by capitalism and technology. Searching for a new solidarity, he finds this in communism, but it has been really a totalitarian military dictatorship run by the Communist Party since Lenin "exposed Marxist socialism to the play of ... influences which divested it of its libertarian elements." Instead of this totalitarian road, a strong and interventionist liberalism is needed, New Deal-style, in the tradition of American leadership in the liberal world order and of the national reforms of Franklin and Theodore Roosevelt. This would be practical and anti-utopian, and would "restore the balance between individual and community".

== Academic freedom ==
Schlesinger writes:

The deeper issue is the freedom of the teacher to teach his subject according to his most responsible understanding of it, and not according to the ukase of a board of trustees, a legislature, a political party, or a foreign country.

He also stated that "unmolested inquiry is essential". He cites Harvard University president James Bryant Conant: "A free society must dedicate itself to the protection of the unpopular view."

== Editions ==
- The Vital Center: The Politics of Freedom. Boston: Houghton Mifflin. 1949.
- The Vital Center: The Politics of Freedom. New Brunswick: Transaction Publishers. 1998. ISBN 1-56000-989-6.
