= Constitutional Educational League =

American anti-communist organization

"The Fifth Column Menaces America on a Thousand Fronts," a propaganda map produced by the League, based on investigations by the House Un-American Activities Committee, purporting to show the extent of Communist, Nazi, and Italian Fascist sympathizers in the United States, 1941

The Constitutional Educational League was an American anti-communist organization.

== History ==
Founded in 1919 during America's First Red Scare, the group gained major influence during the aftermath of the First World War. In the 1930s, they were known for printing an anti-communist newspaper entitled "Headlines and What's Behind Them."

In 1942, the organization was listed as one of 28 organizations indicted by a special grand jury as having conspired against the United States Army and Navy and being an instrument of the Axis Powers.

In the 1944 presidential campaign, the organization published a brochure, Vote CIO and Get A Soviet America. A congressional investigation into the 1944 campaign expenditures sought to find out who the financial backers were of the League, as it deemed this brochure to be political. However, Joseph P. Kamp, vice-president of the League refused to hand over this information. Because Kamp refused to act on a subpoena, he was tried for Contempt of Congress. In 1950, he was convicted, and sentenced to four months in prison. Kamp was tried another time for congressional defiance in 1952, when he failed to produce records for the House Lobby Investigating Committee. This time, Kamp was acquitted of the charge, as the House Committee failed to orderly disclose why Kamp was in default.

== Publications ==
The League's vice president, Joseph P. Kamp, authored most or all pamphlets published:

- Hell of Herrin Rages Again (1937)
- Stop Lewis and Smash Communism! Program of the Constitutional Educational League (1939)
- Fifth Column in Washington! (1940)
- Fifth Column in the South (1940)
- Fifth Column vs. the Dies Committee (1941)
- How to Win the War and Lose What We're Fighting For! (1942)
- Famine in America (1943)
- With Lotions of Love... (1944)
- Vote CIO and Get a Soviet America (1944)
- The Hell with G. I. Joe! (1944)
- Open Letter to Congress. Gentlemen: Are You Mice or Men? An Underworld Secret-Police Terror Menaces America (1948)
- America Betrayed: The Tragic Consequences of Reds on the Government Payroll! (1950)
- It Isn't Safe to be an American (1950)
- We Must Abolish the United States: The Hidden Facts Behind the Crusade for World Government (1950)

== See also ==
- First Red Scare
- McCarthyism (Second Red Scare)
- Joseph P. Kamp
