= Stockholm School (economics) =

School of economic thought (1930s)

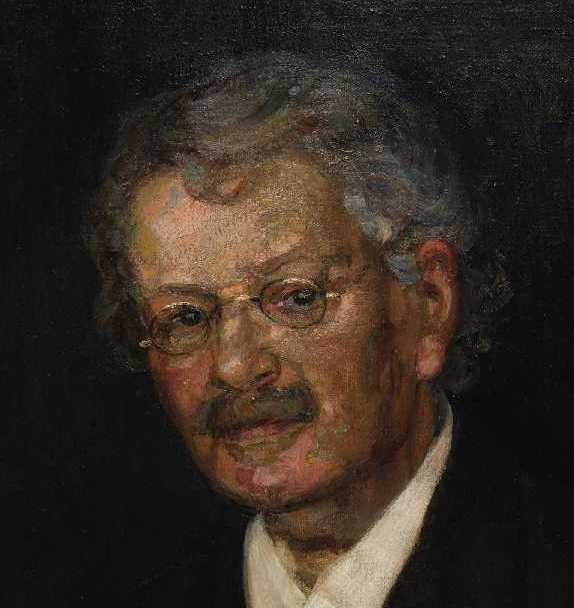
Knut Wicksell, Swedish economist. Important source of inspiration for John Maynard Keynes and the Stockholm School.

The Stockholm School (Swedish: Stockholmsskolan) is a school of economic thought. It refers to a loosely organized group of Swedish economists that worked together, in Stockholm, Sweden primarily in the 1930s.

The Stockholm School had come to the same conclusions about theories of demand and supply as John Maynard Keynes. Like Keynes, they were inspired by the works of Knut Wicksell, a Swedish economist active in the early years of the twentieth century.

William Barber's comment upon Gunnar Myrdal's work on monetary theory goes like this:

"If his contribution had been available to readers of English before 1936, it is interesting to speculate whether the 'revolution' in macroeconomic theory of the depression decade would be referred to as 'Myrdalian' as much as 'Keynesian'”

== History and aspects ==
Two of the most prominent members of the Stockholm School were Stockholm School of Economics professors Gunnar Myrdal and Bertil Ohlin. The movement's name, "The Stockholm School", was launched in an article by Bertil Ohlin in the influential Economic Journal in 1937, "Some Notes on the Stockholm Theory of Savings and Investment".

The article was published in response to the publication of Keynes' magnum opus, The General Theory of Employment, Interest and Money in 1936, and its purpose was to draw international attention to the Swedish discoveries in the field, many of which had predated the discoveries of Keynes. Gunnar Myrdal was early in supporting the theses of John Maynard Keynes, maintaining that the basic idea of adjusting national budgets to slow or speed an economy was first developed in Sweden by him and the Stockholm School.

=== Scandinavian welfare state ===
Myrdal and Ohlin went on to further develop their theories, and in so doing, they developed the intellectual underpinnings of the modern north European welfare state. Their theories were embraced and implemented as national policy by the two powerful arms of the Swedish labor movement, the Swedish Social Democratic Party and the national labor union, the Swedish Trade Union Confederation.

In the post-World War II geopolitical situation of the Cold War, with two rival political blocks, their theories also achieved wide international appeal as a "Third Way", i.e. a middle way between a market economy and a command economy. The objective of this "third way" was to achieve a high level of social equality without undermining economic efficiency.

== Leading members ==
- Gunnar Myrdal, professor at the Stockholm School of Economics, and later Stockholm University, spent many years in the U.S. writing the book An American Dilemma: The Negro Problem and Modern Democracy, an investigation into the situation of African Americans, funded by the Carnegie Foundation. Myrdal co-authored, together with his wife Alva Myrdal the book Crisis in the Population Question, published in 1934. The book served as a major source of inspiration for the construction of the modern Swedish welfare state, relying heavily on government intervention and social engineering to create a "people's home" (Swedish: "Folkhemmet"). The work was later criticized for its discussion of racial issues. Myrdal received the Bank of Sweden Prize in Economic Sciences in Memory of Alfred Nobel (commonly known as the "Nobel Prize for Economics") in 1974.
- Bertil Ohlin, professor at the Stockholm School of Economics, was party leader of the Swedish Liberal People's Party, the largest opposition party in the Swedish Parliament, for over twenty years (1944–1967) battling the powerful incumbent Social Democratic government. Professor Ohlin developed, together with professor Eli Heckscher, a standard economic model of international trade, the Heckscher–Ohlin model. Ohlin received the Bank of Sweden Prize in 1977.
- Gustav Cassel, professor of economics at the Stockholm University, created the standard mathematical formulation of purchasing power parity, a central concept in microeconomics.
- Dag Hammarskjöld, economist. Second Secretary-General of the United Nations. In office 10 April 1953 – 18 September 1961 (when he died in a plane crash on a peacekeeping mission to the Republic of the Congo (Léopoldville)). Dag Hammarskjöld is the only person to have been awarded the Nobel Peace Prize posthumously (Alfred Nobel's testament explicitly states that the prize should be awarded only to the living).
- Erik Lindahl (21 November 1891 – 6 January 1960) was another member of the Stockholm school; he proposed a method of financing public goods in accordance with individual benefits. In the Lindahl equilibrium, the quantity of the public good satisfies the requirement that the aggregate marginal benefit equals the marginal cost of providing the good.
- Ingvar Svennilson (14 March 1908 – 1972) became known for his theories in planned economics.

Other members, such as Erik Lundberg, continued as business cycle-oriented economists.

== See also ==
- Rudolf Meidner
- Social corporatism
- Constitutional economics
