= Hilary Bok =

American philosopher (born 1959)

- Born: 1959 (age 66–67)
- Awards: Laurance S. Rockefeller Fellowship

Education
- Education: Princeton University (BA); Harvard University (PhD)
- Doctoral advisor: John Rawls

Philosophical work
- Era: Contemporary philosophy
- Region: Western philosophy
- School: Analytic philosophy
- Institutions: Johns Hopkins University
- Main interests: Moral theory, Bioethics

Hilary Bok (born 1959) is an American philosopher currently serving as the Henry R. Luce Professor of Bioethics and Moral & Political Theory at Johns Hopkins University.

== Family ==
Her parents are the well-known academics Derek Bok and Sissela Bok and her maternal grandparents were the Swedish economist Gunnar Myrdal and the politician and diplomat Alva Myrdal, both Nobel laureates. Her paternal grandparents were distinguished Pennsylvania jurist Curtis Bok and Margaret Plummer Bok.

== Career ==
Bok received a B.A. in philosophy from Princeton University in 1981 and her Ph.D. from Harvard University in 1991.

She served as associate professor of philosophy at Pomona College from 1997 to 2000. Bok was also a Laurance S. Rockefeller Visiting Fellow at the Princeton University Center for Human Values from 1994 to 1995. Her areas of specialization are bioethics, moral philosophy, free will, and the works of Immanuel Kant. She is a faculty member of the Berman Institute of Bioethics. Bok is the author of Freedom and Responsibility (1998), a Kantian critique of libertarian theories of free will. In addition, she has published work on stem cell research, including in The Lancet.

== Blogging ==
Bok blogged until 2009 under the pseudonym "hilzoy" at the well-known blogs Obsidian Wings and "Political Animal" (the blog of The Washington Monthly magazine).
