= Circular cumulative causation =

Theory of economic and social reform developed by Gunnar Myrdal and Nicholas Kaldor

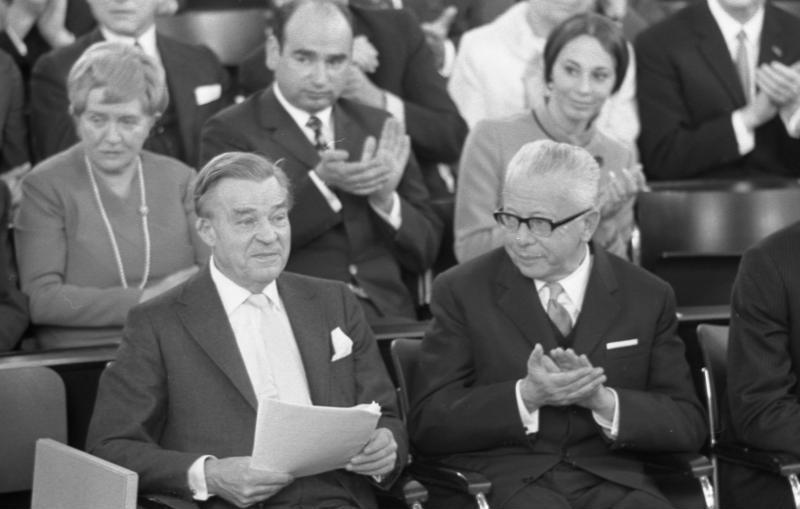
Award of the Peace Prize of the German Book Trade Association to Gunnar and Alva Myrdal (Sweden) in the presence of the Federal President.

Circular cumulative causation is a theory developed by Swedish economist Gunnar Myrdal who applied it systematically for the first time in his 1944 study, An American Dilemma: The Negro Problem and Modern Democracy. It is a multi-causal approach where the core variables and their linkages are delineated. The idea behind it is that a change in one form of an institution will lead to successive changes in other institutions. These changes are circular in that they continue in a cycle, many times in a negative way, in which there is no end, and cumulative in that they persist in each round. The change does not occur all at once as that would lead to chaos, rather the changes occur gradually.

== Overview ==
Gunnar Myrdal developed the concept from Knut Wicksell, and developed it with Nicholas Kaldor when they worked together at the United Nations Economic Commission for Europe. Myrdal concentrated on the social provisioning aspect of development, while Kaldor concentrated on demand–supply relationships to the manufacturing sector. There is also research indicating links with Thorstein Veblen's previous concept of "cumulative causation". Overall, the differences with Veblen's and Kaldor's understanding and application of the concept must not be underestimated (Berger, S. (2009), The Foundations of Non-Equilibrium Economics: The Principle of Circular and Cumulative Causation, New York: Routledge).

== Dynamics ==
In the characteristics that are relevant to the development process of an economy Myrdal mentioned the availability of natural resources, the historical traditions of production activity, national cohesion, religions and ideologies, economic, social and political leadership. Myrdal stated that the immediate effect of closing down certain lines of production in a community is the reduction of employment, income and demand. Through the analysis of the multiplier he pointed out that other sectors of the economy are also affected.

Then he argued that the contraction of the markets in that area tends to have a depressing effect on new investments, which in turn causes a further reduction of income and demand and, if nothing happens to modify the trend, there is a net movement of enterprises and workers towards other areas. Among the further results of these events, fewer local taxes are collected in a time when more social services is required and a vicious downward cumulative cycle is started and a trend towards a lower level of development will be further reinforced.

A status of non-equilibrium is shaped, or as he writes:

"The notion of stable equilibrium is normally a false analogy to choose when constructing a theory to explain the changes in a social system. What is wrong with the stable equilibrium assumption as applied to social reality is the very idea that a social process follows a direction – though it might move towards it in a circuitous way – towards a position which in some sense or other can be described as a state of equilibrium between forces. Behind this idea is another and still more basic assumption, namely that a change will regularly call forth a reaction in the system in the form of changes which on the whole go in the opposite direction to the first change. The idea I want to expound in this book is that, on the contrary, in the normal case there is no such a tendency towards automatic self-stabilisation in the social system. The system is by itself not moving towards any sort of balance between forces, but is constantly on the move away from such a situation. In the normal case a change does not call forth countervailing changes but, instead, supporting changes, which move the system in the same direction as the first change but much further. Because of such circular causation as a social process tends to become cumulative and often gather speed at an accelerating rate" (Myrdal, G., 1957, pp. 12–13, Economic Theory and Underdeveloped Regions, London:University Paperbacks, Methuen).

Myrdal wrote that ‘the argument moves on a general and methodological plane in the sense that the theory is discussed as a complex of broad structures of thought’. His aim was to submit ‘broad generalisations, as a ‘theory’ is permitted to be, in order to grasp the social facts as they organize themselves into a pattern when viewed under a bird's-eye perspective Into this general vision, the specific characteristic (Myrdal, G. 1957, Economic Theory and Underdeveloped Regions, London: University Paperbacks, Methuen).

Myrdal developed further the circular cumulative causation concept and stated that it makes different assumptions from that of stable equilibrium on what can be considered the most important forces guiding the evolution of social processes. These forces characterise the dynamics of these processes in two diverse ways.

Yet, the provision of data or other information regarding single economies was beyond the scope of his work. He claimed that in the normal case there is no such a tendency towards automatic self-stabilisation in the social system. The system is by itself not moving towards any sort of balance between forces, but is constantly on the move away from such a situation Myrdal used the expressions ‘approach’, ‘theory’ and ‘general theory’ as synonyms. In his subsequent writings, however, he mainly referred to ‘approach’, defining it as something containing, among other things, theories. He wrote that by this term he meant a collection of devices, like ‘the concepts, models, and theories we use, and the way in which we select and arrange observations and present the results of our research’.

In the preface to his Economic Theory and Underdeveloped Regions Myrdal wrote that

‘the argument moves on a general and methodological plane in the sense that the theory is discussed as a complex of broad structures of thought’ (Myrdal, G. (1957), Economic Theory and Underdeveloped Regions, London: University Paperbacks, Methuen, vii).)

Myrdal called for economists to proceed by confronting the ‘facts of life’ with theories. The relation between theory and facts is, however, not simple.

Theory … must always be a priori to the observations of facts. Indeed, facts as part of scientific knowledge have no existence outside such a frame. … If theory is thus a priori, it is, on the other hand, a first principle of science that facts are sovereign. Theory is, in other words, never more than a hypothesis. When the observations of facts do not agree with a theory, i.e. when they do not make sense in the frame of the theory utilised in carrying out the research, the theory has to be discarded and replaced by another one which promises a better fit (Myrdal, G. (1957), Economic Theory and Underdeveloped Regions, London: University Paperbacks, Methuen, p. 160).

== Sources ==
- Myrdal, G. (1953) The Political Element in the Development of Economic Theory, London: Routledge and Kegan Paul.
- Myrdal, G. (1931), ‘Några anmärkningar med anledning av Dr. Åkermans uppsats’ (some comments on account of the essay by J. Åkerman), Statsvetenskaplig Tidskrift, 34, 429–46.
- Myrdal, G. (1939), Monetary Equilibrium, Glasgow: William Hodge.
- Myrdal, G. (1944), An American Dilemma: The Negro Problem and Modern Democracy, New York: Harper.
- Principle of circular and cumulative causation: fusing Myrdalian and Kaldorian growth and development dynamics. Journal of Economic Issues, June 1, 2008, O'Hara, Phillip Anthony.
- Myrdal, G. Asian Drama: An Inquiry into the Poverty of Nations. RAND Corporation, 1968.
- Myrdal, G. (1957), Economic Theory and Underdeveloped Regions, London: University Paperbacks, Methuen.
- Berger, S. (2009), The Foundations of Non-Equilibrium Economics: The Principle of Circular Cumulative Causation, New York: Routledge.

== See also ==
- Boots theory
- Cycle of poverty
