= Nicholas Kaldor =

Hungarian-British economist

The Right Honourable The Lord Kaldor
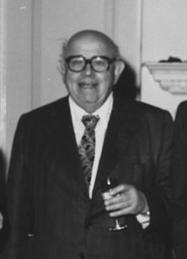
- Born: Káldor Miklós; 12 May 1908; Budapest, Austria-Hungary
- Died: 30 September 1986 (aged 78); Papworth Everard, Cambridgeshire, England

Academic background
- Doctoral advisors: Allyn Abbott Young; Lionel Robbins
- Influences: John Maynard Keynes, Gunnar Myrdal

Academic work
- Discipline: Political economy
- School or tradition: Post-Keynesian economics
- Doctoral students: Frank Hahn
- Notable ideas: Kaldor–Hicks efficiency Kaldor's growth laws Circular cumulative causation

Nicholas Kaldor, Baron Kaldor (12 May 1908 – 30 September 1986), born Káldor Miklós, was a Hungarian-born British economist. He developed the "compensation" criteria called Kaldor–Hicks efficiency for welfare comparisons (1939), derived the cobweb model, and argued for certain regularities observable in economic growth, which are called Kaldor's growth laws. Kaldor worked alongside Gunnar Myrdal to develop the key concept Circular Cumulative Causation, a multicausal approach where the core variables and their linkages are delineated.

== Biography ==
Káldor Miklós was born in Budapest, son of Gyula Káldor, lawyer and legal adviser to the German legation in Budapest, and Jamba, an accomplished linguist and "a well-educated, cultured woman". He was educated in Budapest, as well as in Berlin, and at the London School of Economics, where he graduated with a first-class BSc (Econ.) degree in 1930. He subsequently became an assistant lecturer and, by 1938, lecturer and reader in economics at the LSE. Between 1943 and 1945, Kaldor worked for the National Institute of Economic and Social Research and in 1947 he resigned from the LSE to become Director of Research and Planning at the Economic Commission for Europe. He was elected to a Fellowship at King's College, Cambridge and offered a lectureship in the Economics Faculty of the University in 1949. He became a Reader in Economics in 1952, and Professor in 1966.

From 1964, Kaldor was an advisor to the Labour government of the UK and also advised several other countries, producing some of the earliest memoranda regarding the creation of value added tax. Inter alia, Kaldor was considered, with his fellow-Hungarian Thomas Balogh, one of the intellectual authors of the 1964–1970 Harold Wilson's government's short-lived Selective Employment Tax (SET) designed to tax employment in service sectors while subsidising employment in manufacturing. In 1966, he became professor of economics at the University of Cambridge. On 9 July 1974, Kaldor was made a life peer as Baron Kaldor, of Newnham in the City of Cambridge.

In 1969–1970, Kaldor was involved in a fierce debate with the U.S. monetarist economist Milton Friedman. While Friedman defended the exogenous money supply theory, according to which money is created by powerful central banks, Kaldor and Post-Keynesian economists claimed that money is created by second-tier banks through the distribution of credits to households and companies. In the Post-Keynesian framework, central banks only refinance second-tier banks on demand, but they are unable to properly create money. Despite insightful contributions, Kaldor could not initially win the debate, as monetarist policies were implemented by most central banks. He would, however, later be vindicated by empirical findings and policy, with money creation now being generally agreed to be mostly endogenous. In 1981, he was one of the 364 economists who signed a letter to The Times condemning Geoffrey Howe's 1981 Budget. In 1982, he published a book entitled The Scourge of Monetarism, deeply criticizing monetarist-inspired policies.

Kaldor was invited by then Prime Minister of India—Jawaharlal Nehru—to design an expenditure tax system for India in the 1950s. He also went to India's Centre for Development Studies (CDS) in 1985 to inaugurate and deliver the first Joan Robinson Memorial Lecture. Owing to these links, the Kaldor family donated his entire personal collection to the CDS Library. There are 362 books in the collection and they cover a wide range of titles on economic theory, classical political economy, business cycles and history of economic thought.

Kaldor was married to Clarissa Goldschmidt, a history graduate from Somerville College, Oxford, and Frances Stewart the economist and Mary Kaldor the political scientist are their children.

== Business cycle theory ==
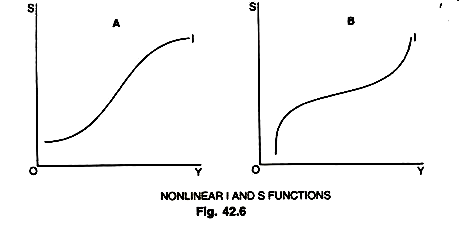
Non-linear I and S functions generated by different behavior at different parts of the cycle

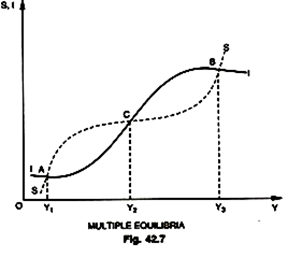
Non-linear I and S functions lead to multiple, shifting equilibria.

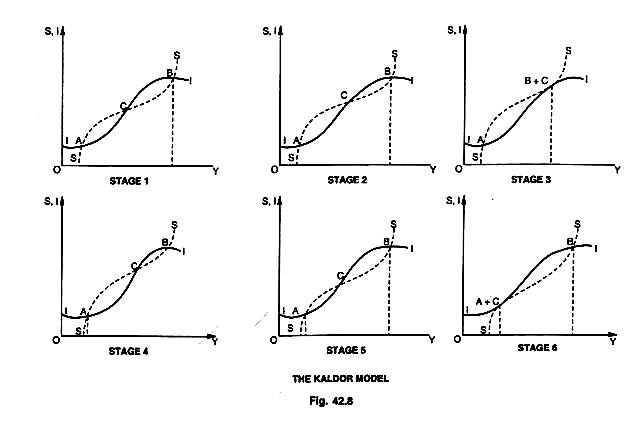
Shifting, multiple equilibria lead to six-stage business cycle in which the economy oscillates around optimal income growth and generates phases of boom and bust.

After the publication of John Maynard Keynes' General Theory, many attempts were made to build a business cycle model. The models that were built by American Neo-Keynesians such as Paul Samuelson proved unstable. They could not describe why an economy should cycle through recession and growth in a stable fashion. The British Neo-Keynesian John Hicks tried to improve the theory by imposing rigid ceilings and floors on the model. But most people thought that this was a poor way of explaining the cycle as it relied on artificial, exogenous constraints. Kaldor, however, had actually invented a fully coherent and highly realistic account of the business cycle in 1940. He used non-linear dynamics to construct this theory. Kaldor's theory was similar to Samuelson's and Hicks' as it used a multiplier-accelerator model to understand the cycle. It differed from these theories, however, as Kaldor introduced the capital stock as an important determinant of the trade cycle. This was in keeping with Keynes' sketch of the business cycle in his General Theory.

Following Keynes, Kaldor argued that investment depended positively on income and negatively on the accumulated capital stock. The idea that investment depends positively on the growth of income is simply the idea of the accelerator model that holds that in periods of high income growth and hence demand growth, investment should rise in the anticipation of high income and demand growth in the future. The intuition lying behind the negative relationship to the accumulation of the capital stock is due to the fact that if firms have a very large amount of productive capacity accumulated already they will not be as inclined to invest in more. Kaldor was in effect integrating Roy Harrod's ideas about unbalanced growth into his theory.

In the standard accelerator model that stood behind Samuelson's and Hicks' business cycle theories investment was determined as such:

$I_t = I_a+w(Y_{t-1}-Y_{t-2})$

This states that investment is determined by exogenous investment and lagged income multiplied by the accelerator coefficient. Kaldor's model modified this to include a negative coefficient for the capital stock:

$I_t = I_a+w(Y_{t-1}-Y_{t-2})-jK$

Kaldor then assumed that the investment and savings functions are non-linear. He argued that at the peaks and troughs of the cycle the marginal propensity to save shifts in opposite ways. The intuition behind this is that during recessions people will cut their savings to maintain their standard of living while at high levels of income people will save a larger proportion of their income. He also argued that at the peaks and troughs of the cycle the marginal propensity to invest shifts. The intuition behind this is that at the trough of the cycle there will be a large amount of excess capacity and so businessmen will not want to invest more, while at the peak of the cycle rising costs will discourage investment. This creates non-linear dynamics in the economy that then drive the business cycle.

When Kaldor combines these components we get a clear six-stage model of the business cycle. In the first stage the economy is in equilibrium position. Investment is taking place and the capital stock is growing. In the second stage the growth in the capital stock leads to a downward shift in the investment curve as businessmen decide their factories become overfull. In the third stage (which overlaps with the second stage) the high growth in income causes higher saving which pushes the savings curve upwards. At this point the two curves become tangential and the equilibrium becomes unstable which generates a recession. In the fourth stage the same dynamics kick in but this time moving in the opposite direction. By the sixth stage the equilibrium is again unstable and a boom is produced.

Kaldor also noted the importance of income distribution in his theory of the business cycle. He assumed that savings out of profits were higher than savings out of wages; that is, he argued that poorer people (workers) tend to save less than richer people (capitalists). Or:

$S_w<S_p$

Kaldor believed that the business cycle had an inherent mechanism built into it that redistributed income across the cycle and that these mitigated "explosive" results. As we have seen, in a cyclical upswing where planned investment begins to outstrip planned savings prices will tend to rise. Kaldor assumed that those who set prices have more power than those who set wages and so prices will tend to rise faster than wages. This means that profits must also rise faster than wages. Kaldor argued that due to the different savings propensities of capitalists and workers this will lead to higher savings. This will then dampen the cycle somewhat. In a recession or depression Kaldor argued that prices should fall faster than wages for the same reasons that Keynes laid out in his General Theory. This meant that income would be redistributed to workers as real wages rose. This would lead savings to fall in a recession or depression and so would dampen the cycle.

Kaldor's model assumes wage and price flexibility. If wage and price flexibility are not forthcoming the economy may have a tendency to either perpetual and rising inflation or persistent stagnation. Kaldor also makes strong assumptions about how wages and prices respond in both inflations and depressions. If these assumptions do not hold Kaldor's model would lead us to conclude that the cycle might give way to either perpetual and rising inflation or stagnation.

Kaldor's non-linear business cycle theory overcomes the difficulty that many economists had with Roy Harrod's growth theory. Many of the American Neo-Keynesian economists thought that Harrod's work implied that capitalism would tend toward extremes of zero and infinite growth and that there were no dynamics that might keep it in check. Robert Solow, who eventually created the Solow Growth Model in response to these perceived problems, summarised this view as such:

Keep in mind that Harrod’s first Essay was published in 1939 and Domar’s first article in 1946. Growth theory, like much else in macroeconomics, was a product of the depression of the 1930s and of the war that finally ended it. So was I. Nevertheless it seemed to me that the story told by these models felt wrong. An expedition from Mars arriving on Earth having read this literature would have expected to find only the wreckage of a capitalism that had shaken itself to pieces long ago. Economic history was indeed a record of fluctuations as well as of growth, but most business cycles seemed to be self-limiting. Sustained, though disturbed, growth was not a rarity.

In fact, Kaldor's 1940 paper had already shown this to be completely untrue. Solow was working with an erroneous and underdeveloped theory of the business cycle that he had taken over from Samuelson. By the time Solow was working on his growth theory, the Cambridge UK economists had already satisfactorily laid out a self-limiting theory of the business cycle that they thought was a reasonable description of the real world. This is one of the reasons that the Cambridge economists were so hostile in their reaction to Solow's growth model and went on to attack it in the Cambridge Capital Controversy of the 1960s. The ignorance on the part of the American economists' knowledge of Kaldor's model also explains why the Cambridge Post-Keynesian economists found the ISLM model favoured by the American Neo-Keynesians to be crude and lacking.

== Personal life ==
Kaldor was married to Clarissa Goldsmith. They had four daughters.

He died in Papworth Everard, Cambridgeshire.

== Works ==
- The Case Against Technical Progress, 1932, Economica
- The Determinateness of Static Equilibrium, 1934, RES
- The Equilibrium of the Firm, 1934, EJ
- Market Imperfection and Excess Capacity, 1935, Economica
- Pigou on Money Wages in Relation to Unemployment, 1937, EJ
- 1939, Welfare propositions of economics and interpersonal comparisons of utility. Economic Journal 49:549–52.
- Speculation and Economic Stability, 1939, RES
- Capital Intensity and the Trade Cycle, 1939, Economica
- A Model of the Trade Cycle, 1940, EJ
- Professor Hayek and the Concertina Effect, 1942, Economica
- The Relation of Economic Growth and Cyclical Fluctuations, 1954 EJ
- An Expenditure Tax, 1955.
- "Alternative Theories of Distribution", 1956, RES
- A Model of Economic Growth, 1957, EJ
- Monetary Policy, Economic Stability, and Growth, 1958.
- Economic Growth and the Problem of Inflation, 1959, Economica.
- A Rejoinder to Mr. Atsumi and Professor Tobin, 1960, RES
- Keynes's Theory of the Own-Rates of Interest, 1960, in Kaldor, 1960.
- Essays on Value and Distribution, 1960.
- Essays on Economic Stability and Growth, 1960.
- Capital Accumulation and Economic Growth, 1961, in Lutz, editor, Theory of Capital
- A New Model of Economic Growth, with James A. Mirrlees, 1962, RES
- The Case for a Commodity Reserve Currency, with A.G. Hart and J. Tinbergen, 1964, UNCTAD
- Essays on Economic Policy, 1964, two volumes.
- Causes of the Slow Rate of Economic Growth in the UK, 1966.
- The Case for Regional Policies, 1970, Scottish JE.
- The New Monetarism, 1970, Lloyds Bank Review
- Conflicts in National Economic Objectives, 1971, EJ
- The Irrelevance of Equilibrium Economics, 1972, EJ
- What is Wrong with Economic Theory, 1975, QJE
- Inflation and Recession in the World Economy, 1976, EJ
- Equilibrium Theory and Growth Theory, 1977, in Boskin, editor, Economics and Human Welfare.
- Capitalism and Industrial Development, 1977, Cambridge JE
- Further Essays on Economic Theory, 1978.
- The Role of Increasing Returns, Technical Progress and Cumulative Causation..., 1981, Economie Appliquee
- Fallacies on Monetarism, 1981, Kredit und Kapital.
- The Scourge of Monetarism, 1982.
- The economic consequences of Mrs. Thatcher, 1983.
- The Role of Commodity Prices in Economic Recovery, 1983, Lloyds Bank Review
- Keynesian Economics After Fifty Years, 1983, in Trevithick and Worswick, editors, Keynes and the Modern World
- Economics Without Equilibrium, 1985.
- Causes of Growth and Stagnation in the World Economy, 1996 (posthumous, based on 1984 Mattioli Lectures)

== See also ==
- Kaldor's facts
- Kaldor's growth laws
