= Erik Lundberg =

Swedish economist

- Born: 13 August 1907; Saint Matthew's Parish, Stockholm, Sweden
- Died: 14 September 1987 (aged 80); Saltsjöbaden Parish, Sweden
- Education: Stockholm School of Economics, Stockholm University
- Occupation: economist

Erik Filip Lundberg (13 August 1907 – 14 September 1987) was a Swedish economist, born in Stockholm. He was a professor of political economics at Stockholm University and a member of the Stockholm School of economic thought. He was president of the International Economic Association from 1968 to 1971. From 1969 to 1979, he was a member of the committee that selected the laureates for the Sveriges Riksbank Prize in Economic Sciences, the Economics Prize Committee, and served as the committee's chairman from 1975 to 1979.

Erik Lundberg was the son of mathematician Filip Lundberg Ph.D. (1876–1965) and Astrid Bergstedt. In 1931–1933 he studied in the United States as Rockefeller Scholar, after his associate degree at Stockholm University, and when he returned to Sweden he received a post at the Riksbank's economic secretariat. In 1934 he was economic planning committee financial advisor in Iceland.

He took his doctorate in 1937 with studies in the theory of economic expansion, and in the same year received employment at the Institute of Economic Research, where he became head in 1944. He was one of Finance Minister Ernst Wigforss' closest advisers and at about the same time was appointed the first professor of economics at Stockholm University, a position he held from 1946 to 1965. He was also expert in various state investigations in the 1930s and 1940s.

In 1933–1935 Lundberg, Ingvar Svennilson and Gösta Bagge published Wages in Sweden 1860–1930 I-II. In his doctoral thesis Lundberg developed the economic theory which Keynes presented in the Treatise of Money, and attempted, mainly by Knut Wicksell's work, to combine it with a dynamic aspect, and launched a business cycle and a non-equilibrium theory. In other works he investigated investments dual roles of demand and supply, and stated that this could lead to an imbalance in growth.

His early work studied how the economy is affected by export and import. In Produktivitet och räntabilitet (The productivity and return on investments) in 1961 he coined the phrase "The Horndalseffect" to describe an increase in productivity without investment. In the 1980s, his research focused on the economic crisis and the influence on politics of the major economists of the 1900s.
