= Folkhemmet =

Swedish political thought

Folkhemmet (Swedish: [ˈfɔ̂lkˌhɛmːɛt], lit. 'the people's home') is a political concept that played an important role in the history of the Swedish Social Democratic Party and the Swedish welfare state. It is also sometimes used to refer to the long period between 1932 and 1976 when the Social Democrats were in power (except for a brief period in 1936 when Axel Pehrsson-Bramstorp from the Farmers' League was prime minister) and the concept was put into practice, but also works as a poetic name for the Swedish welfare state. Sometimes referred to as "the Swedish Middle Way", folkhemmet was viewed as midway between capitalism and socialism. The base of the folkhem vision is that the entire society ought to be like a family, where everybody contributes, but also where everybody looks after one another. The Swedish Social Democrats' successes in the postwar period is often explained by the fact that the party managed to motivate major social reforms with the idea of the folkhem and the national family's joint endeavor.

The Social Democratic leaders Ernst Wigforss, an avid Keynesian, Gustav Möller and Per Albin Hansson, a social corporatist, are considered the main architects of folkhemmet, with inspiration from the conservative Rudolf Kjellén and the Danish Social Democrats C.V. Bramsnæs and Karl Kristian Steincke. It was later developed by Prime Ministers Tage Erlander and Olof Palme until the Social Democratic Party lost power in 1976. Another important proponent was Hjalmar Branting, who came into contact with the concept while a student at Uppsala University, and went on to become the first socialist Prime Minister of Sweden.

== History ==
=== Conservative corporatism ===
The term is thought to have its roots in Rudolf Kjellén's vision of a corporatist-styled society based on class collaboration in the national interest, largely based on the German Verein für Socialpolitik's juxtaposing of conservative stability and continuity to social reforms otherwise associated with socialist parties, such as universal healthcare and unemployment benefits, as well as ideas from the British Fabian Society and American Progressivism.

=== Social democracy ===
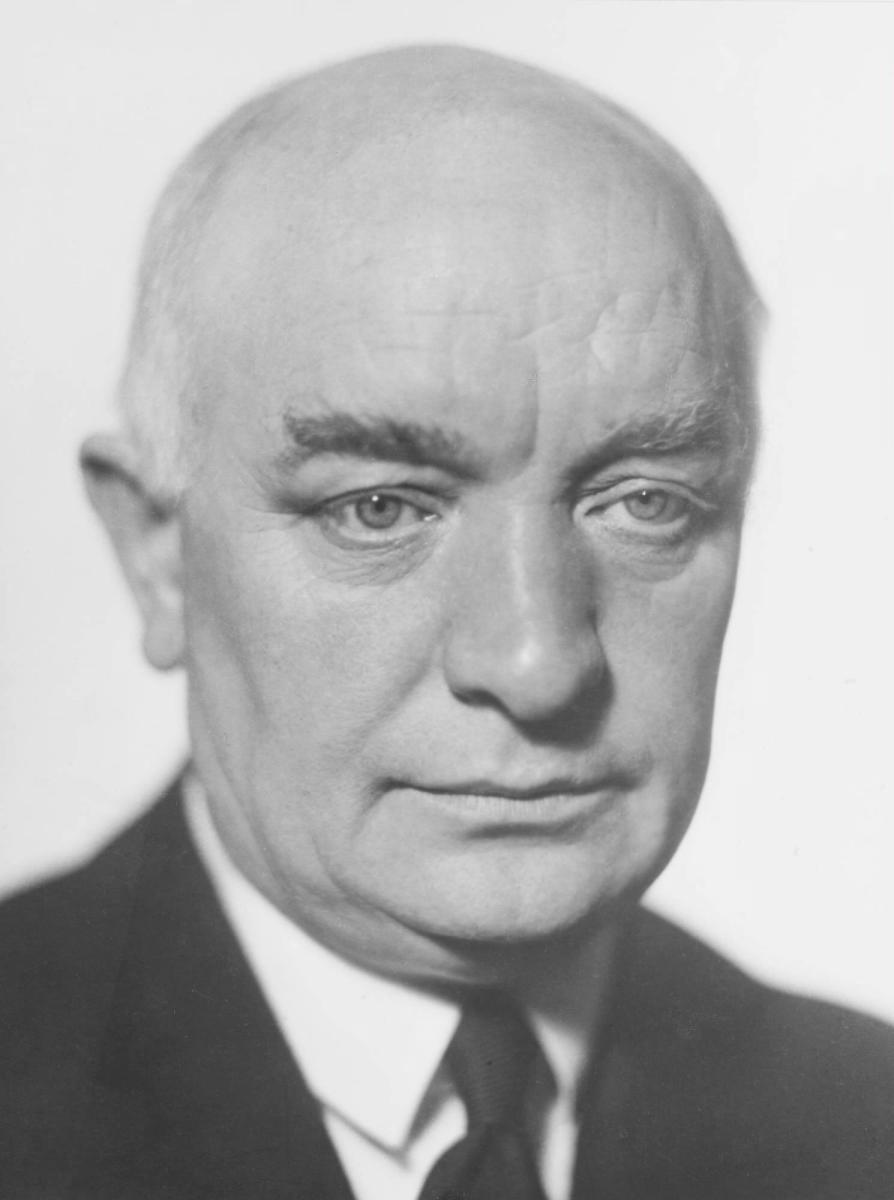
Per Albin Hansson

Per Albin Hansson introduced the concept on 18 January 1928, saying that Sweden should become more like a "good home", this being marked by equality and mutual understanding. Hansson advocated that the traditional class society should then be replaced by "the people's home" (folkhemmet). In his famous speech on 18 January 1928, Hansson expressed the Social Democrats' view of society:

The good home knows no privileged or misfortuned, no favorites or undesired. There no one looks down on the other. There none try to gain benefits on the others expense, the strong do not oppress and plunder the weak. In the good home reigns equality, kindness, cooperation, helpfulness.

After Hansson, the same policy was continued until the late 1960s by Prime Minister Tage Erlander. According to the Social Democrats, the people's home is a democratic welfare society that operates on the principle of common spirit and community. This, they say, requires social policies such as universal health insurance, child benefits, an occupational pension scheme and primary school. Political opponents often did not oppose these reforms per se, but warned of their cost and tax tightening.

The concept came at a time when nationalization was being questioned, and marked the party's abandonment of the notion of class struggle, a concept fundamental to the early Social Democratic movement. Instead, they adapted a planned economy under what would later be called funktionssocialism, where businesses were controlled through regulations rather than government ownership. The government would then also have more control over the individual, however, to the extent required to increase the wellbeing of citizens.

Good and easily available education, even to higher levels, was considered particularly important for building the new society. As a result, Sweden became one of the first countries in the world to offer free education at all levels, including all public universities, along with several new universities founded during the 1960s. Free universal health care was provided by the state, enacted in 1947–55, along with numerous other social services.

== Myrdal's influence ==
During the 1930s, Human population planning became an important part of folkhemmet. Alva and Gunnar Myrdal's 1934 book Crisis in the Population Question inspired a radical and progressive policy for how to deal with a declining population. A number of changes took place in this period including expansion of the public sector, Wigforss' economic policies, Gustav Möller's reform of the pension system, and Gunnar Myrdal's housing policies. Alva and Gunnar Myrdal suggested a series of programs designed to increase population growth by increasing the freedoms and rights of childbearing women and children.

In the 1940s and 50s, old, worn down houses that served as the overcrowded dwellings of the lower class were demolished. Instead, people were offered modern housing with bathrooms and windows to let light into every room, so called funkis architecture. To remedy the housing shortage during the Record Years, the country's industrial boom, the Million Programme accomplished the construction of one million new homes 1965-75. The program included state mortgages favoring large-scale industrial construction of high-rise districts, primarily on the outskirts of cities, which is what the programme in retrospect is notorious for, but also to townhouses and privately owned single-family homes, often in commuter towns.

== In popular culture ==
- In 1983, Magnus Uggla recorded the album Välkommen till folkhemmet.

== See also ==
- Welfare in Sweden
- Volksgemeinschaft
- Nilsjohan, a Swedish manufacturer whose products were associated with the Folkhemmet movement
