= Soft State =

Term describing a general societal indiscipline

The Soft State is a term introduced by Gunnar Myrdal in his Asian Drama to describe a general societal “indiscipline” prevalent in Asia and by extension much of the developing world - in comparison to the kind of modern state that had emerged in Europe. Myrdal used the term to describe:

... all the various types of social indiscipline which manifest themselves by deficiencies in legislation and, in particular, law observance and enforcement, a widespread disobedience by public officials and, often, their collusion with powerful persons and groups ... whose conduct they should regulate. Within the concept of the soft states belongs also corruption (Myrdal, (1970), p 208).

For Myrdal a major causal factor was colonial powers' destruction of many of the traditional centers of local power and influence and failure to create viable alternatives. Coupled with this was the development of an attitude of disobedience to any authority which was central to the nationalist politics resistance. This attitude persisted after independence. Such soft states are seen as unlikely to be capable of imposing the right development policies and would be unwilling to act against corruption at all levels.

== Soft state paradigm ==
According to the soft state paradigm, there are two types of statehood:

1. Empirical:The state in its empirical sense is defined and determined by its demonstrable capacity in such matters as competitive pressures of the classical states-system (for example, was the respect and recognition accorded by other governments) and the development of armed forces, courts and magistrates, and police forces. This type of state, originating in competitive Europe, was built by under strong pressures for disintegration, both domestic and international. This empirical state is also found in North America, South America, the Middle East, and Asia.

2. Juridical:The juridical state is the novel-moral-legal foundation of the collaborative states-system that has emerged in many parts of the ex-colonial world, particularly tropical Africa; it lacks the essentials of statehood, sovereignty is guaranteed by the world community of states as embodied in the United Nations.
