= Sissela Bok =

Swedish-American philosopher (born 1934)

- Born: Sissela Myrdal; 2 December 1934 (age 91); Sweden

Education
- Education: George Washington University
- Academic advisor: John Rawls

Philosophical work
- Era: Contemporary philosophy
- Region: Western philosophy
- School: Continental
- Main interests: Ethics

Sissela Bok (born Myrdal; 2 December 1934) is a Swedish-born American philosopher and ethicist, the daughter of two Nobel Prize winners: Gunnar Myrdal who won the Economics prize with Friedrich Hayek in 1974, and Alva Myrdal who won the Nobel Peace Prize in 1982. She is considered one of the premier American moral philosophers of the latter part of the 20th century.

== Biography ==
Bok received her B.A. and M.A. in psychology from George Washington University in 1957 and 1958, and her Ph.D. in philosophy from Harvard University in 1970. She worked at Simmons University (1971–72), the Harvard-MIT Program in Health Sciences and Technology (1975–82), Brandeis University (1985–92), and the Harvard Center for Population and Development Studies at the Harvard School of Public Health (1993–2022).

Bok is married to Derek Bok, former president (1971–1991, interim 2006–2007) of Harvard. Her daughter, Hilary Bok, is also a philosopher. Her brother, Jan Myrdal, was a political writer and journalist. Her sister Kaj Fölster (1936) is an author, politician and social scientist, who lived and worked many years in Germany and received the Order of Merit of the Federal Republic of Germany in 2014.

Bok was awarded the Orwell Award in 1978 for Lying: Moral Choice in Public and Private Life.

Bok was awarded the Courage of Conscience award on 24 April 1991 "for her contributions to peacemaking strategies in the tradition of her mother."

== Books ==
- Lying: Moral Choice in Public and Private Life (Pantheon Books, 1978; Vintage paperback editions, 1979, 1989, 1999).
- Secrets: on the Ethics of Concealment and Revelation (Pantheon Books, 1982; Vintage paperback editions, 1984, 1989).
- A Strategy for Peace: Human Values and the Threat of War (Pantheon Books, 1989; Vintage paperback edition, 1990).
- Alva Myrdal: A Daughter's Memoir (Addison-Wesley, 1991; paperback edition 1992).
- Common Values (University of Missouri Press, 1995; paperback edition 2002).
- Mayhem: Violence as Public Entertainment (Perseus, 1998; paperback edition 1999).
- Euthanasia and Physician-Assisted Suicide, with Gerald Dworkin and Ray Frey (Cambridge University Press, 1998).
- Exploring Happiness: From Aristotle to Brain Science (Yale University Press, 2010).
