= Kaldor's growth laws =

Laws relating to economic growth

Kaldor's growth laws are a series of three laws relating to the causation of economic growth.

Looking at the countries of the world now and through time Nicholas Kaldor noted a high correlation between living standards and the share of resources devoted to industrial activity, at least up to some level of income. Only New Zealand, Australia and Canada have become rich whilst relying mainly on agriculture. He proposed three laws on these empirical regularities:

1. The growth of the GDP is positively related to the growth of the manufacturing sector. This is perhaps better stated in terms of GDP growth being faster the greater the excess of growth of industrial growth relative to GDP growth: that is when the share of industry in GDP is rising.
2. The productivity of the manufacturing sector is positively related the growth of the manufacturing sector (this is also known as Verdoorn's law). Here the argument is that there are increasing returns to scale in manufacturing. These may be static—where the larger the size of the sector the lower the average costs—or dynamic via the induced effect that output growth has on capital accumulation and technical progress. Learning by doing effects are also likely to be important.
3. The productivity of the non-manufacturing sector is positively related to the growth of the manufacturing sector. This last law is the least intuitive and is based on the argument that the non-industrial sector has diminishing returns to scale. As resources are moved out the average productivity of those that remain will rise.

Thirlwall (2003, p123–124) also reports Kaldor's highlighting of three subsidiary propositions which are also important to take into account. They are:

1. That as the scope for the increasing returns sector to absorb the labour from the diminishing returns sector reduces so too will the rate of growth of GDP.
2. That in the early stages of industrialisation the demand comes from the agricultural sector—but in the later stages export demand is likely to drive the process. Here the limited size of the internal market is likely to be such as to limit the realisation of economies of scale and there is the need for generating foreign exchange to import necessary inputs.
3. A virtuous circle can be generated by export growth and output growth but that this is difficult to establish as it is likely to depend on exceptional enterprise, protection or subsidy.
