= Veblen-Commons Award =

The Veblen-Commons Award is presented annually by the Association for Evolutionary Economics in recognition of outstanding scholarly contributions to the field of evolutionary institutional economics. It is the Association’s highest honor, named after two key originators of the evolutionary-institutionalist tradition, Thorstein B. Veblen and John R. Commons.

== Evolutionary institutional economics ==
According to evolutionary institutionalism, economics “is the science of social provisioning.” To be sure, markets are important, but the market system is only one institution that influences the social provisioning process. Moreover, that system can take countless forms and is shaped by history and culture. Thus, understanding culture—how it evolves and its role in economic life—is a foundational element of evolutionary institutionalism.

Empiricism is also a vital part of the evolutionary-institutionalist tradition. In fact, along with Veblen and Commons, Wesley C. Mitchell—founder of the National Bureau of Economic Research—was a major early contributor to institutionalism. Since the days of Veblen, Commons, and Mitchell, evolutionary institutionalists have sought to collect and use economic and social data (quantitative and qualitative in nature) in service of both scientific understanding and practical problem solving.

== Award recipients ==
The Veblen-Commons Award has been given since 1969, with the first recipient being Allan Gruchy. Other early recipients include Gardiner Means, Gunnar Myrdal, John Kenneth Galbraith, and Rexford Tugwell.

In the 1980s, J. Fagg Foster, David Hamilton, Harry Trebing, Marc Tool, and Wendell Gordon were among the winners. In the 1990s, winners included Wallace Peterson, Robert Heilbroner, and Hyman Minsky.

More recent winners include Anne Mayhew, Edythe Miller, F. Gregory Hayden, Willam Dugger, Glen Atkinson, William Waller, Jim Peach, Janet Knoedler, and James K. Galbraith.

A detailed description of the award, biography of the current winner, and list of past recipients can be found on the AFEE website.
