= Non-equilibrium economics =

Branch of economic theory

Non-equilibrium economics or out-of-equilibrium economics is a branch of economic theory that examines the behavior of economic agents and markets in situations where traditional approaches of economic equilibrium do not hold.

== Overview ==
Economic models in the tradition of partial or general equilibrium theory rely on the notion of economic equilibrium: because of quick price adaptation to an equilibrium price, supply equals demand and markets clear. Equilibrium theory goes back to the contributions by Léon Walras in 1874 and constitutes the core of dynamic stochastic general equilibrium models (DSGE), the current predominant framework of macroeconomic analysis. The goal to study the dynamics that may or may not lead to an equilibrium was already formulated by the developers of general equilibrium models such as Vilfredo Pareto, but despite some efforts, they were unable to describe the adaptive processes that were thought to converge to the states analyzed in static theory. Research in the tradition of Disequilibrium macroeconomics which was influential in the 1970s departed from some equilibrium assumptions such as market clearing and quick price adaption, studying markets with fixed prices, leading to models of "non-Walrasian" equilibrium with rationing, but not to a genuine out-of-equilibrium dynamic analysis.

In contrast, non-equilibrium economics focuses on the dynamics of economic systems in states of flux, where imbalances, frictions, and external shocks can lead to persistent deviations from equilibrium or to multiple equilibria. This approach is used to study phenomena such as market crashes, economic crises, and the effects of policy interventions. By using approaches from complex systems, behavioral economics, and non-linear dynamics, out-of-equilibrium economics emphasizes the importance of time, uncertainty, bounded rationality and the role of institutions in shaping economic outcomes. It was developed starting in the 1980s with the spread of computational economics and is used in the fields of evolutionary and institutional economics, Post Keynesian economics, Austrian economics, Ecological economics, development and growth economics.

== Model approaches ==
=== Agent-based computational economics ===
Agent-based computational economics studies economic processes as dynamic systems of interacting, bounded rational agents that usually follow some discrete decision sequence. Falling in the paradigms of complex adaptive systems and complexity economics, it analyzes the emergence of either a (statistical) equilibrium, but also discontinuities, tipping points, lock-ins or path dependencies. Different coordinating mechanisms such as price adaptation, auctions, matching or quantity rationing are implemented.

=== Circular Cumulative Causation ===
Circular cumulative causation is an economic concept developed by Gunnar Myrdal that describes a self-reinforcing process where initial changes in economic variables lead to further changes, creating a feedback loop that can amplify economic trends. By emphasizing the interconnectedness of economic activities, it tries to gains insights into issues like regional development, inequality, and the persistence of economic disparities.

=== Constrained Dynamics ===
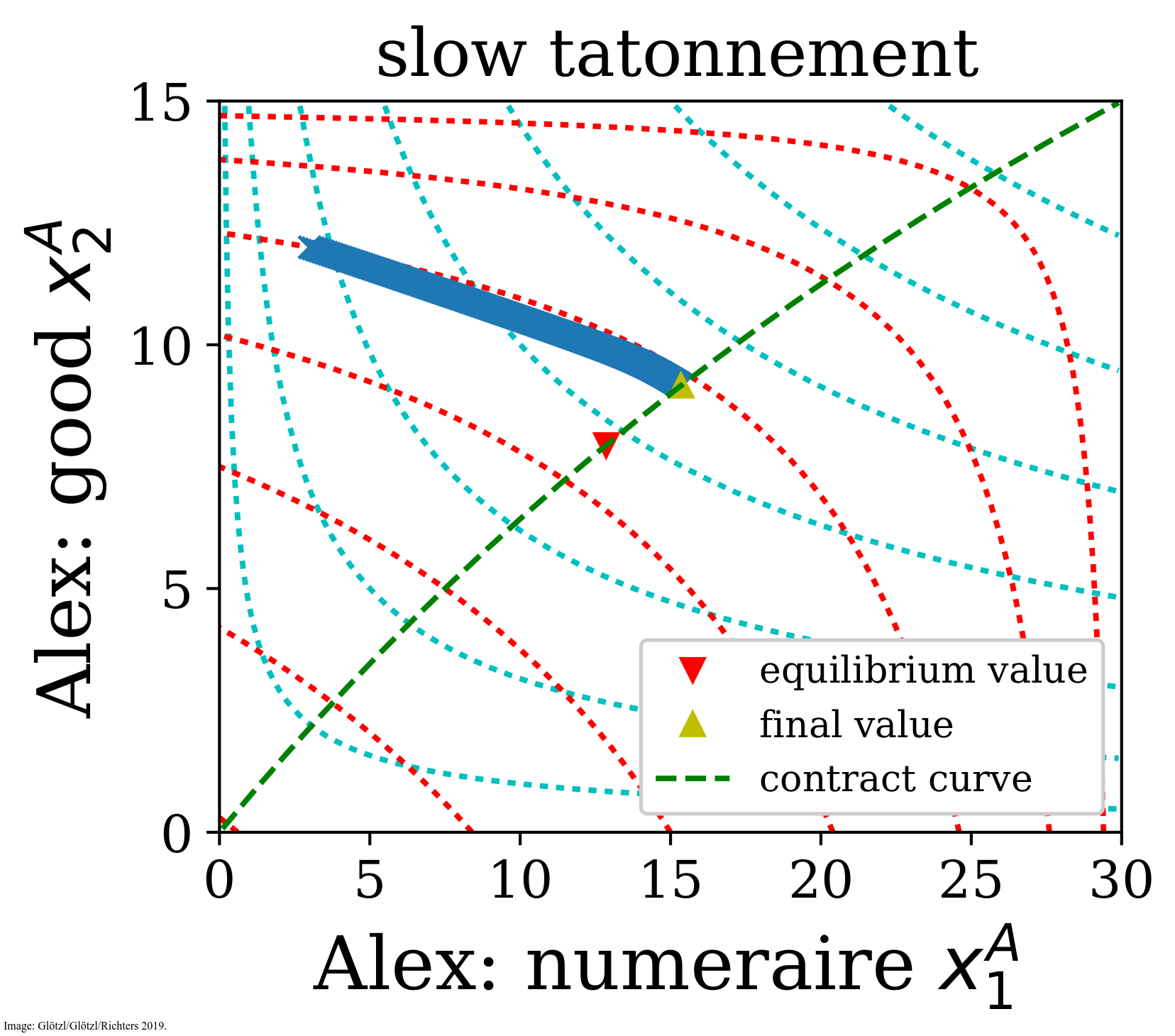
Edgeworth box model with slow tatonnement, converging to a stationary state that differs from the usual equilibrium value because of false trading

Constrained dynamics models the economy as interacting, bounded rational agents that try to adjust the economic variables to improve their situation (hill climbing as opposed to utility maximization). Economic constraints such as the budget constraints or accounting identities are guaranteed by concepts similar to constraints in Lagrangian mechanics.

=== Evolutionary Game Theory ===
Evolutionary game theory studies the strategic interactions of boundedly rational players, focusing both on the dynamic paths to reach equilibrium and the evolutionary stable equilibrium. Modeling concepts include differential equations, stochastic processes, graphs and evolutionary algorithms.

=== Stock-Flow Consistent models ===
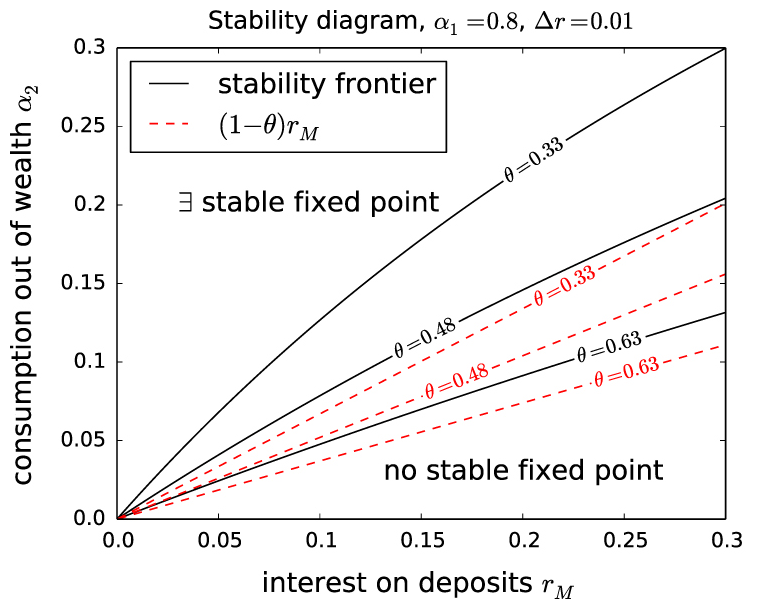
A stability analysis shows the parameter ranges in which an SFC model is stable or unstable.

Stock-flow consistent models (SFC) are a class of economic models that ensure coherence between stocks and flows in an economy, emphasizing the relationships between different sectors and their balance sheets, while maintaining consistency in accounting identities. Rejecting the classical dichotomy, they model the dynamic adaptation processes of real and financial variables for studying macroeconomic phenomena such as the effects of fiscal policy, financial instability, and the interactions between different economic agents.

=== Statistical Mechanics ===
The use of statistical mechanics in economics involves applying concepts and methods from physics to analyze and model complex economic systems, particularly those characterized by a large number of interacting agents. This approach allows economists to study emergent phenomena, such as market behavior and collective decision-making, by treating economic agents as particles in a statistical ensemble, thereby uncovering patterns, networks and distributions that arise from individual actions.
