= False economy =

Economics concept

In economics, a false economy or hallucinated economy is an action that does save money at the beginning but which, over a longer period of time, results in more money being spent or wasted than being saved. For example, it may be false economy if a city government decides to purchase the cheapest automobiles for use by city workers to save money; however, if cheap automobiles have a record of needing more frequent repairs, the additional repair costs would negate any initial savings.

Motivating factors on the part of the party engaging in a false economy may be linked to the long-term involvement of this party. For example, a real estate developer who builds a condominium may turn the finished structure over to the ensuing condominium corporation which is run by its members once the last unit is sold and the building has passed a final inspection. Longevity of the components of the structure beyond the final turnover of the facility may not be a major motivating factor for the developer, meaning that the result of the application of false economies may be more detrimental to the end user, as opposed to the developer.

Individuals may also practise false economy in their personal lives. A notable practitioner of false economy was King Frederick William I of Prussia, who was said by Thomas Macaulay to have saved five or six reichsthalers a year by feeding his family unwholesome cabbages even though the poor diet sickened his children and the resulting medical care cost him many times what he saved.

Some examples of potential false economies include:

- Purchasing cheaper products that do not last as long or may require more maintenance than the more expensive alternatives (buying cheap shoes, cheap paint), or purchasing certain counterfeit consumer goods that are less durable than their genuine counterparts;
- Paying just the minimum amount on a credit card bill each month;
- Deferred maintenance, such as not servicing a vehicle on time;
- Opting to take the DIY approach for home projects rather than hiring a professional.

All these examples save the consumer some amount of money in the short-run, however could end up costing the consumer more further down the road.

The concept is related to planned obsolescence, whereby the lower initial cost of a product attracts buyers mostly on the basis of low cost, but who may later be at a disadvantage if the product becomes obsolete early.

Those in poverty often opt into false economies when they perceive that they cannot afford the better long-term option in the short-term.

== See also ==
- Total cost of ownership
- Planned obsolescence
- Boots theory
