= Confessions of a Disloyal European =

1964 book by Jan Myrdal

- Author: Jan Myrdal
- Original title: Samtida bekännelser av en europeisk intellektuell
- Language: Swedish
- Publisher: Norstedts förlag
- Publication date: 1964
- Publication place: Sweden
- English publication date: 1968
- Pages: 153

Confessions of a Disloyal European (Swedish: Samtida bekännelser av en europeisk intellektuell, lit. 'Contemporary Confessions of a European Intellectual') is a 1964 book by the Swedish writer Jan Myrdal. It consists of anecdotes and ruminations related to the moral duties of intellectuals, with a frame story about Myrdal's guilt over his lack of action to help a mentally ill woman who committed suicide. The book is presented as partially a work of fiction.

Kirkus Reviews called Myrdal "unmistakably European from top to toe" in his attempt at "an unmasking of the Western intellectual tradition" and described the book's narrator as "partly a Strindbergian narcissist, partly an angry young man, and partly a cold fish".

According to Myrdal, his 1975 book Karriär (lit. 'Career') can be regarded as a continuation of Confessions of a Disloyal European.
