= Nilsjohan =

Swedish kitchen accessory manufacturer

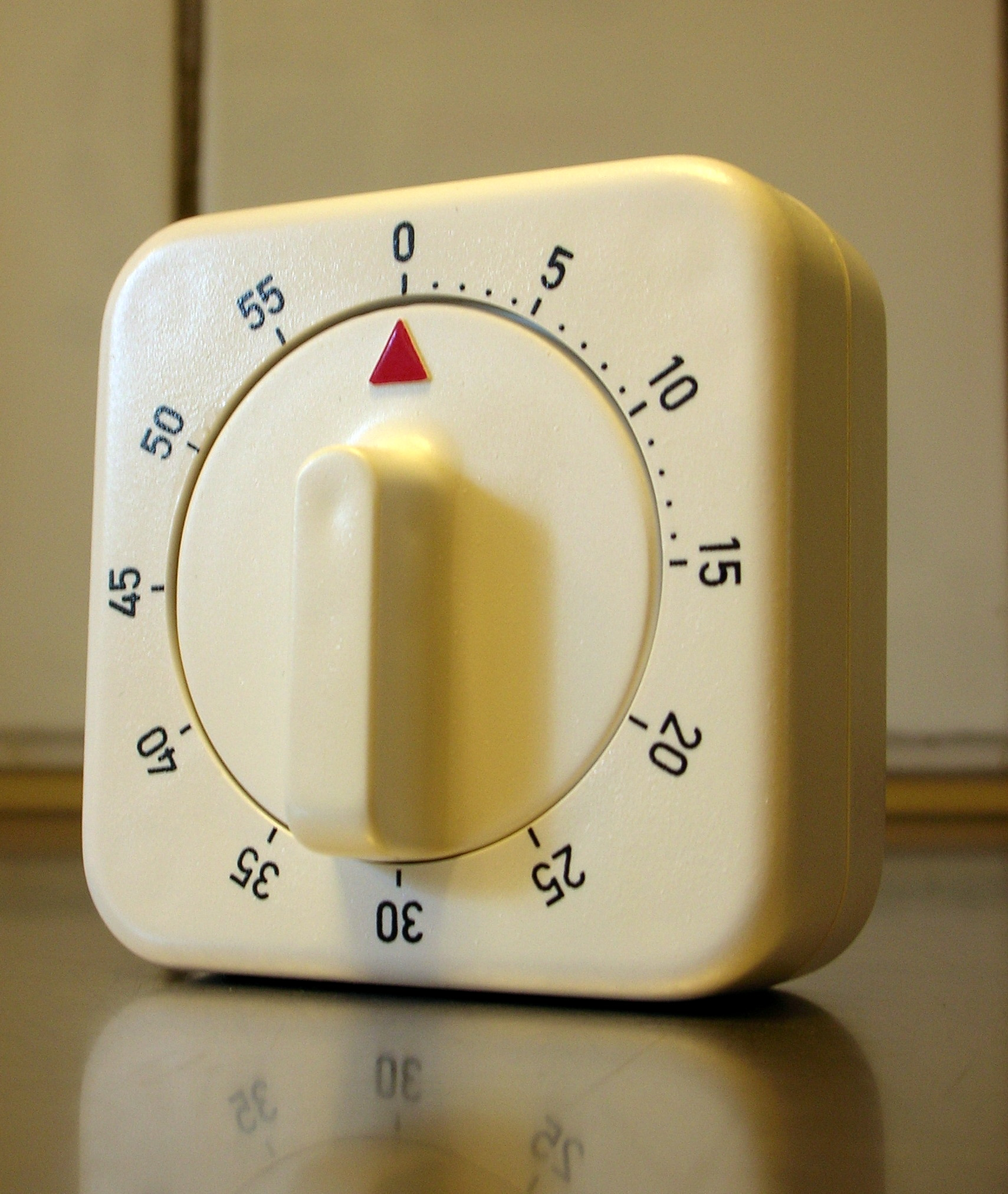
A Nilsjohan kitchen timer.

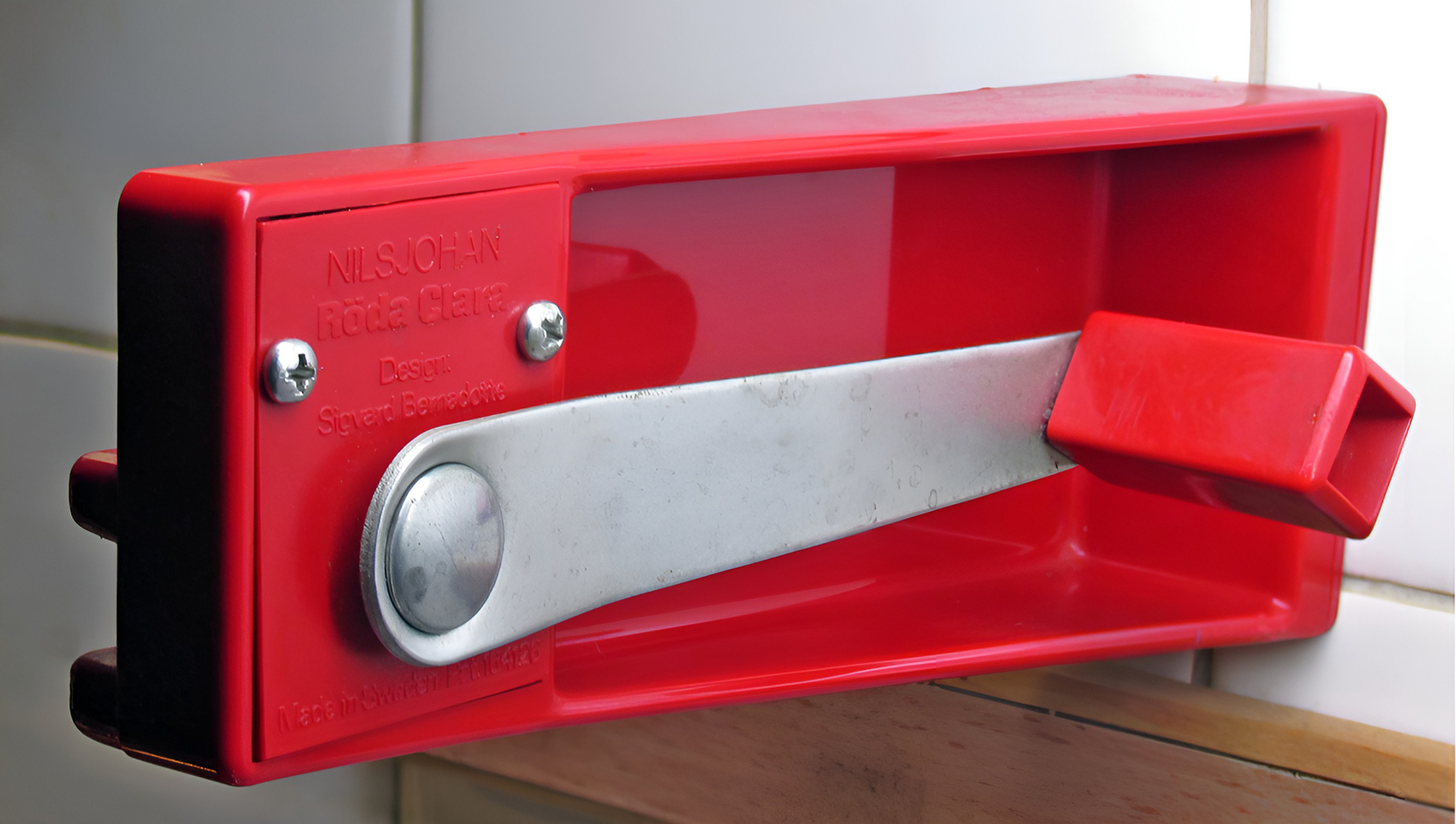
Can opener Röda Clara. Design by Sigvard Bernadotte.

Nilsjohan was a Swedish manufacturer of kitchen accessories. The company was founded in 1888 as Nilsson och Johansson, but changed its name to AB Nilsjohan in the 1950s. Their products were associated with the 20th-century Folkhemmet movement. The brand was later acquired by Iittala.
