= Boots theory =

Economic theory by Terry Pratchett

The Sam Vimes theory of socioeconomic unfairness, often called simply the boots theory, is an economic theory that people in poverty have to buy cheap and subpar products that need to be replaced repeatedly, proving more expensive in the long run than more expensive items. The term was coined by English fantasy writer Sir Terry Pratchett in his 1993 Discworld novel Men at Arms. In the novel, Sam Vimes, the captain of the Ankh-Morpork City Watch, illustrates the concept with the example of boots.

The theory has been cited with regard to analyses of the prices of boots, fuel prices, and economic conditions in the United Kingdom.

== Conception ==
In the Discworld series of novels by Terry Pratchett, Sam Vimes is the captain of the City Watch of the fictional city-state of Ankh-Morpork. In the 1993 novel Men at Arms, the second novel focusing on the City Watch through Vimes' perspective, Vimes muses on how expensive it is to be poor:

The reason that the rich were so rich, Vimes reasoned, was because they managed to spend less money. Take boots, for example. ... A really good pair of leather boots cost fifty dollars. But an affordable pair of boots, which were sort of OK for a season or two and then leaked like hell when the cardboard gave out, cost about ten dollars. ... But the thing was that good boots lasted for years and years. A man who could afford fifty dollars had a pair of boots that'd still be keeping his feet dry in ten years' time, while a poor man who could only afford cheap boots would have spent a hundred dollars on boots in the same time and would still have wet feet.

This was the Captain Samuel Vimes 'Boots' theory of socio-economic unfairness.

In the New Statesman, Marc Burrows hypothesized Pratchett drew inspiration from Robert Tressell's 1914 novel The Ragged-Trousered Philanthropists. In the book Fashion in the Fairy Tale Tradition, Rebecca-Anne C. Do Rozario argued "shoes and economic autonomy are inexorably linked" in fairy tales, citing the Boots theory as "particularly relevant" and "an insightful metaphor for inequality".

== Examples ==
Since the publication of Men at Arms, others have also made reference to the theory.

In 2013, an article by the US ConsumerAffairs made reference to the theory in regard to purchasing items on credit, specifically regarding children's boots from the retailer Fingerhut; a $25 pair of boots, at the interest rates being offered, would cost $37 if purchased over seven months. In 2016, the left-wing blog Dorset Eye also ran an article discussing the theory, giving fuel poverty in the United Kingdom as an example of its application, citing a 2014 Office for National Statistics (ONS) report that those who pre-paid for electricity—who were most likely to be subject to fuel poverty—paid 8% more on their electricity bills than those who paid by direct debit.

In a 2020 discussion paper for the Social and Political Research Foundation, Sitara Srinivas used the theory to analyze how sustainable fashion is inaccessible compared to fast fashion. In an article titled "The Price of Poverty" published in Tribune Magazine in 2022, the theory was cited as explaining the economic predicament in the United Kingdom. Examples provided included the higher cost of renting compared to home ownership, higher interest rates for loans to impoverished people, the effects of food poverty on educational advancement, and healthcare costs.

== See also ==
- Bulk purchasing – Purchasing large quantities for a low unit price
- Cost of poverty – Poor people often incur higher expenses due to lack of options
- Circular cumulative causation – Theory of economic and social reform developed by Gunnar Myrdal and Nicholas Kaldor
- Cycle of poverty – Vicious cycle that reinforces poverty
- False economy – Economics concept
- Hyperbolic discounting – Economics concept
- Inferior good – Concept in economics
- Poverty industry – Businesses that make most of their money from the poor
- Time preference – Difference in valuation of a payoff when receiving it earlier versus later
