= Albania Defiant =

- Author: Gun Kessle, Jan Myrdal
- Original title: Albansk utmaning
- Translator: Paul Britten Austin
- Genre: Travel book
- Publisher: PAN/Nordstedt, Monthly Review Press
- Publication date: 1970
- Publication place: Sweden
- English publication date: 1976
- ISBN: 9780853453567

Albania Defiant (Swedish: Albansk utmaning) is a travel book by the Swedish authors Gun Kessle and Jan Myrdal, originally published in 1970 and translated to English in 1976 by Paul Britten Austin. It was reprinted in 1986, with six additional new chapters. In Swedish it was published by PAN/Nordstedt, in English by Monthly Review Press.

The book, which is deeply sympathetic to the Party of Labour of Albania (PPSh), was written by Kessle and Myrdal – who were married until Kessle's death in 2007 – about their travels in the People's Republic of Albania. It deals with a number of issues, including the country's economy, culture and history, as well as the political leadership of Enver Hoxha.

== Reception ==
The book was poorly received by several writers critical of Myrdal and the People's Republic of Albania. In Historical Dictionary of Scandinavian Literature and Theater (2006), Professor Jan Sjåvik wrote that Myrdal's "inability to perceive the horrors of Enver Hoxha's regime attests to both his idealism and his penchant for viewing the world through ideological glasses".

Writing for Expressen in 2007, the Swedish-Polish author and journalist Jackie Jakubowski described Myrdal as a "collaborator with all sorts of murderous regimes", citing for example a quote from Albania Defiant regarding Hoxha's many achievements. In 2008, the former Liberal Member of Parliament Martin Andreasson wrote about the book, likewise expressing criticism towards its support for the PPSh and Hoxha.

== See also ==
- Swedish–Albanian Association
- Hoxhaism
- Sino-Albanian split
