= Lying (Bok book) =

1978 book by philosopher Sissela Bok

Lying: Moral Choice in Public and Private Life
- First edition
- Author: Sissela Bok
- Subject: Ethics
- Publisher: Pantheon
- Publication date: 1978
- Pages: 326

Lying: Moral Choice in Public and Private Life is a 1978 book by philosopher Sissela Bok that covers the ethical issues in lying, such as intent, result, context, and circumstances. It was published by Pantheon Books.
