= Jan Myrdal =

Swedish writer (1927–2020)

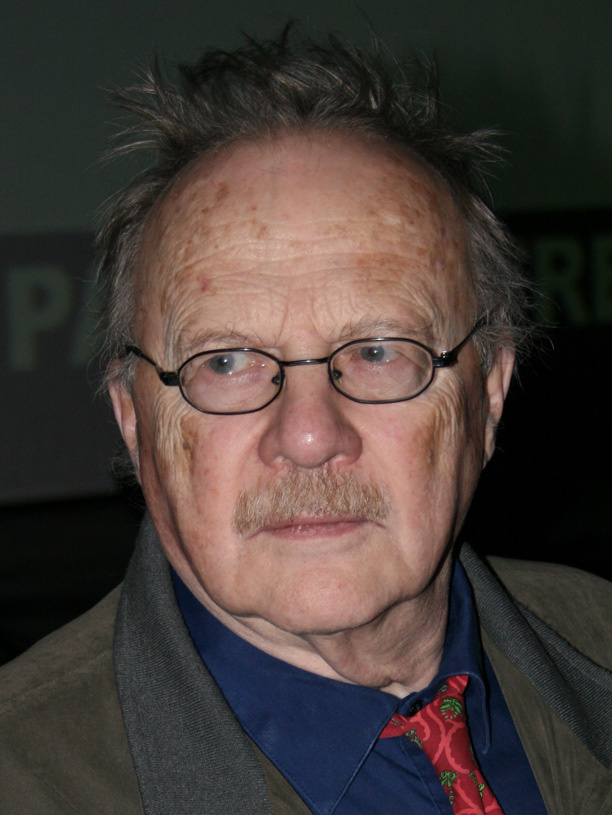
Myrdal in 2007

Jan Myrdal (19 July 1927 – 30 October 2020) was a Swedish author known for his strident Maoist, anti-imperialist and contrarian views and heterodox and highly subjective style of autobiography.

== Family ==
Born in Bromma, Stockholm, in 1927, Jan Myrdal was the son of two of Sweden's most influential 20th century intellectuals, Nobel Laureates Alva Myrdal (née Reimer) and Gunnar Myrdal, and the brother of Sissela Bok and Kaj Fölster. Through his sister Sissela, Myrdal was the brother-in-law of Dean of Harvard Law School and longtime president of Harvard University, Derek Bok.

Myrdal married four times. His first two wives, Maj Lidberg (1952–1956) and Nadja Wiking (1948–1952), bore him two children, Janken Myrdal (with Wiking) and Eva Myrdal (with Lidberg). Myrdal left both wives and their children at a young age, and, for most of his life, he would live with his third wife Gun Kessle (1926–2007). A graphic artist and photographer, she illustrated many of his works. After Kessle's death, Myrdal married Andrea Gaytán Vega in 2008. They divorced in 2018.

As a matter of public record and, indeed, as noted in Myrdal's own writings, several family members severed ties with him after personal conflicts, due to his abandonment of their relationships, or in protest of his portrayals of the Myrdal family. His last book A Second Reprieve (2019), drew criticism for its graphic depiction of his own and his past wives' sexual and adulterous relationships, although it also garnered praise as a work of unflinching introspection.

An animal lover, Myrdal and Kessle (and later Myrdal, alone) owned a succession of cats and dogs, which feature in many of his books.

== Biography ==
As a young child, Myrdal followed his parents to the United States shortly before the Second World War. After the German occupation of Norway in 1940, the family feared that a Nazi invasion of Sweden could be imminent and decided to return. Jan initially protested, perceiving himself at that time as a naturalized American; he would later stress the role that his childhood in New York had in shaping his intellectual evolution.

Relations between Myrdal and his parents were troubled, as he would later relate in several books. At sixteen, he dropped out of high school to focus on writing and politics. He initially had little success as a journalist and an author, which he attributed in part to his political views and to the influence of his parents, both of whom were leading figures within Sweden's ruling Social Democratic party.

Having adopted Marxist-Leninist ideas already in the mid-1940s, Myrdal was for some years a member of Democratic Youth, the youth wing of Swedish Communist Party.

=== "The Big Life" ===
Starting in the late 1950s, Myrdal and his third wife, Kessle, embarked on a series of journeys in the Third World. Myrdal referred to his abandonment of settled life and family, and his henceforth complete dedication to intellectual and political pursuits, as "the big life" ("det stora livet"), characterizing it as a choice that came to define his life.

The couple lived for years in Afghanistan, Iran, and India. Myrdal began to focus his writings on anti-colonial politics and developed a politically-minded travel literature. An early example was his 1960 book Crossroads of Culture, later reissued as Travels in Afghanistan.

Since the mid-1950s, Myrdal had grown critical of the Soviet Union and he now gave voice to these misgivings, including works on the Soviet republics in Central Asia. As his heterodox Marxist-Leninist and anti-colonial ideas drew him to Maoist-style Communism, he became a stalwart defender of Mao Zedong's Chinese government and, later, of the Cultural Revolution. His 1963 book Report from a Chinese Village achieved some international success when released in English in 1965, offering a then very rare socio-political study of life in rural China, albeit from a clear pro-Maoist perspective. Several of Myrdal's works were subsequently banned in the Eastern Bloc.

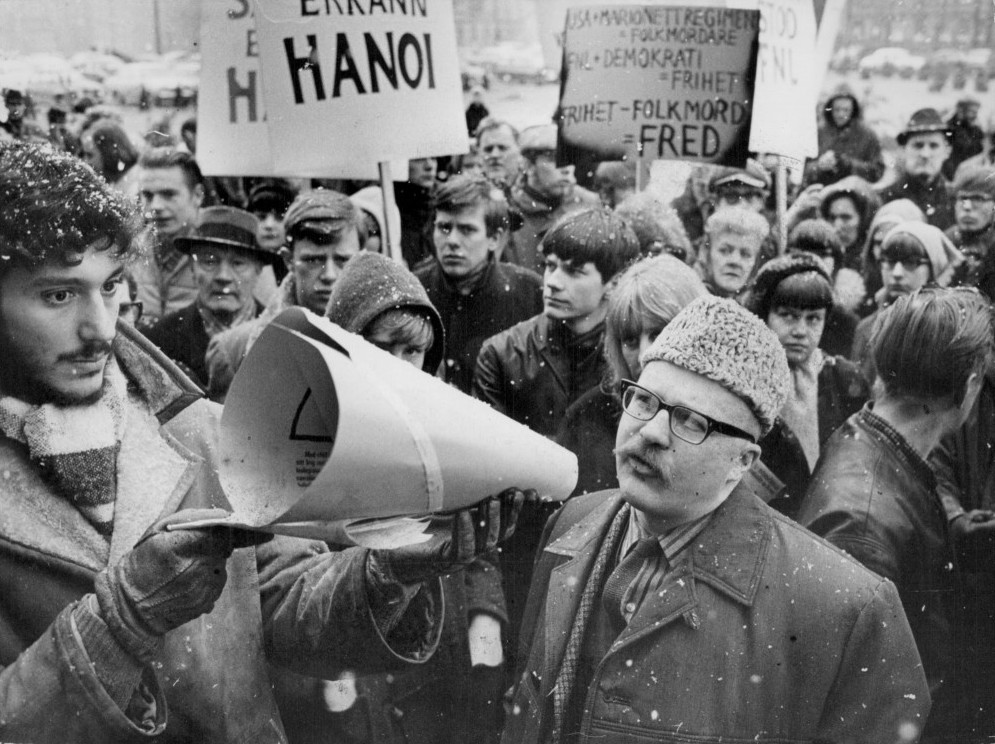
Jan Myrdal speaking at a demonstration against the Vietnam War at Medborgarplatsen in Stockholm, March 1966.

In the mid-1960s, Myrdal, who had returned to Sweden and settled with Kessle outside Mariefred, emerged as a major ideologue of Sweden's youthful new left. He was also a prominent writer and organizer within the Swedish anti-Vietnam War movement. Still, he published on a wide range of subjects beyond anti-imperialist politics, establishing himself as a highly idiosyncratic voice on the far left of Swedish politics and culture.

A signature work was Confessions of a Disloyal European, published in original English in 1968 though in large part based on the merger of two previous Swedish books. It juxtaposes a deeply personal tragedy – a suicide that Myrdal failed to prevent – with what he views as the irresponsible political detachment of himself and other Western intellectuals ("the whores of reason"), as they fail to intervene against an impending Third World War produced by the contradictions of capitalism. In its mixing of personal and political themes and its fragmented structure, it presaged Myrdal's later "I novels". John Leonard of the New York Times described it as an "extraordinary" book and "a particularly disturbing combination of fiction, reportage and allegory", while Kirkus Reviews offered a more mixed opinion of what was termed a "curious document of social guilt".

In 1972, Myrdal co-founded Folket i Bild/Kulturfront (FiB/K), a political-cultural monthly "for freedom of speech and of the press; for a people's culture and anti-imperialism". He remained involved with the magazine for much of his life, and continued to pen a regular column in it until 2019. FiB/K garnered major attention when it broke the IB affair in 1973, damaging the ruling Social Democratic Party by calling Swedish neutrality into question.

In line with his pro-Chinese, anti-Soviet politics, Myrdal supported Democratic Kampuchea (Cambodia) against Vietnamese invasion in the 1970s, notwithstanding his long support for the Vietnamese struggle against the United States. Invited to Kampuchea as a guest of Pol Pot's government, Myrdal wrote positively of the experience and said he had seen "no horror stories". His defense of the Khmer Rouge and his dismissal of the reports of a genocide drew criticism in Sweden, and would remain a subject of controversy for the remainder of his life; he never recanted his pro-Khmer Rouge views.

In the early 1980s, Myrdal helped found a Swedish solidarity movement with the Afghan resistance against Soviet occupation. He had come to espouse the view that the Soviet Union had evolved into an even more menacing imperialist threat than the United States, urging Sweden to spend on national defense. He criticized post-Maoist China's adoption of market economics under Deng Xiaoping, but continued to write appreciatively of Enver Hoxha's Albania, for example in Albania Defiant.

=== The I Novels ===
In 1982, Myrdal's literary career took a new turn with the publication of Childhood. A semi-autobiographical work somewhat in the mold of Confessions, it caused a scandal due to its unflattering depiction of his parents, Gunnar and Alva. Myrdal would continue to publish in the genre, which he labeled I novels ("jagböcker"), for the rest of his life, telling and retelling his life in fragmentary stories interwoven with political and historical material. Increasingly, the I novels dealt with themes of aging, memory, and death. The last in the series would be his final book, A Second Reprieve (2019).

Although the I novels cemented Myrdal's position as a major figure in Swedish literature and intellectual life, his political influence waned from the late 1970s on. After the end of the Cold War, he grew increasingly marginalized after many of his former supporters renounced their previous support of Marxist-Leninist politics. In contrast to many other 1960s-era leftist intellectuals, Myrdal made no concessions to the new intellectual climate; rather, he doubled down on his views to the point where he began to be viewed as a politically toxic figure.

Nevertheless, as he turned 80 in 2007, Swedish National Television described him as "one of the most significant [Swedish] authors of the 20th century", while noting that his political views had been "strongly criticized".

=== Later life ===
In the early 2000s, Myrdal and Kessle moved from their longtime residence in Fagervik, near Mariefred, to Skinnskatteberg. A year after Kessle's death in 2007, Myrdal remarried with Mexico-born Andrea Gaytán Vega, 34 years his junior. They split in 2011, then reconciled, and finally divorced in 2018. Myrdal lived for some time with Gaytán Vega in Fagersta, but spent most of his later life in Varberg.

In 1988, Myrdal had had to undergo open-heart surgery; the entire procedure was recorded and turned into an educational documentary shown on Swedish television and in schools. His health again deteriorated in the 2010s, when he was in his eighties. A near-death experience by sepsis is chronicled in A Second Reprieve (2019).

In 2008, admirers of Myrdal created Jan Myrdal Society, a literary society that sought to support his writing and stimulate research into his and Kessle's work. Sponsored by Lasse Diding, a left-wing millionaire resident in Varberg, the Society helped move Myrdal himself and his 50,000-volume book collection to Varberg, where it established the Jan Myrdal Library, in which the author took up residence. However, the Society and Myrdal repeatedly clashed over various issues, political and financial. The Society also gives out the Lenin Award to a writer or filmmaker every year, which the first years also was called The Jan Myrdal Big Prize.

In 2011 at the prize ceremony, Myrdal had this to say about our times: "Right now, it smells again like Europe 1914. The summer/autumn of 1914 therefore gives us excellent examples of precisely cultural worker behaviour. It’s not that strange. The ruling thoughts are the thoughts of the rulers, and it is we who become pipes through which the wind of power blows."

Having ended his regular column in FiB/K in November 2019 at age 92, Myrdal was finally forced to cease writing due to ill health in 2020.

=== Death ===
Jan Myrdal died in Varberg on 30 October 2020, aged 93. Announcing his death, Jan Myrdal Society chairwoman Cecilia Cervin wrote: "The person Jan Myrdal is dead. To wish peace upon his memory would be an expression of the bourgeois sentimentality that he loathed. So, instead: Read his works, visit and use his library, and, above all: continue the struggle in his spirit!" The Chinese Embassy in Stockholm sent an official letter of condolences, describing Myrdal as "an old friend of the Chinese people".

In accordance with Myrdal's wishes, his body was donated to a university hospital for surgery practice.

== Legacy ==
The Jan Myrdal Society continues to operate the Jan Myrdal Library in Varberg, which is open to researchers. According to the Society, about a third of the volumes in the Library are held by no other Swedish library, testifying to Myrdal's decades of book-collecting in Sweden and abroad, including during his Asian, African, and Latin American travels.

== Recognition ==
- Ordre des Arts et des Lettres, France
- Honorary doctor of literature from Upsala College in New Jersey, US
- PhD from Nankai University, Tianjin, China

== Political views ==
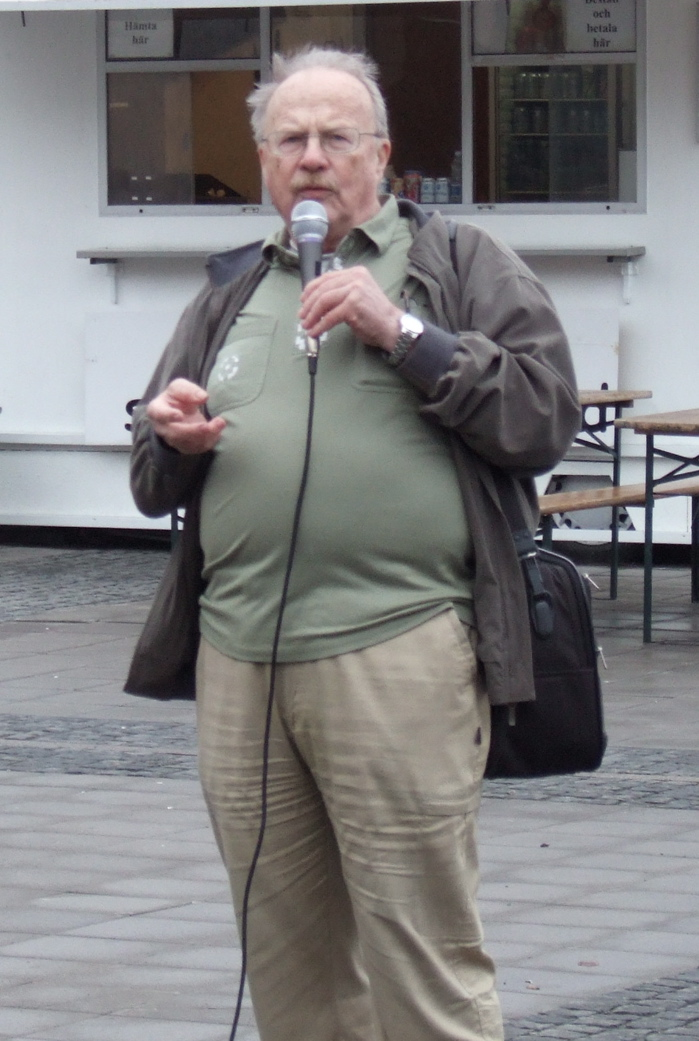
Myrdal in an open-air meeting against Swedish involvement in the war in Afghanistan, October 2007

Myrdal was a life-long Marxist-Leninist, after breaking with the social democratic politics of his parents at an early age. He supported the politics of the Soviet-backed Swedish Communist Party in the 1940s and early 1950s, but later shifted to a pro-China, anti-colonialist and anti-imperialist brand of Communism, infused with strong, idiosyncratic views on Swedish culture and history. At times, he referred to himself as a Maoist or a Naxalite, although he generally shunned political labels and preferred to speak in terms of a leftist intellectual tradition.

After ending his involvement with the Moscow-backed Communist movement in the mid-1950s, Myrdal never again joined a political party, preferring to position himself as an independent thinker and writer. However, from 1968 to 1973 he headed the Swedish-Chinese Friendship Association. From 1971 to 1972 and again from 1987 to 1989, he was the publisher and chairman of the board of Folket i Bild/Kulturfront (FiB/K). In addition, he exerted influence of a more indirect nature as the intellectual lodestar of the KFML, a Maoist group that gained a very active student following in the late 1960s and 1970s. The KFML and its allies were the dominant faction within Sweden's large and culturally influential pro-Vietnam movement, which protested the U.S. war in that country. These groups magnified Myrdal's influence within the anti-war movement, when it was at its peak in terms of political and cultural influence. He later played a similar role in mobilizing a smaller but nonetheless energetic movement to oppose the Soviet occupation of Afghanistan.

Myrdal's view of the Chinese Communist Party as a political model expired after Mao Zedong's death, and Myrdal was highly critical of Deng Xiaoping's rule. In keeping with this dim view of China's new leadership, he condemned the 1989 Tiananmen Square massacre and described the Beijing government as "a military regime of the fascist type". In 1997, however, Myrdal publicly revised this opinion, saying he had come to the conclusion that although the protests had merit, the government crackdown had ultimately become necessary in order to prevent China from collapsing into internal conflict. Therefore, he said, "[t]he question can not be whether it was moral or immoral to shed blood on the square of Heavenly Peace in the summer of 1989, but whether it was necessary or not in order to prevent a Bosnia in billion-size proportion and a possible Pacific war. If it was necessary, as I now believe, then it was right and moral. If it was not necessary, then it was wrong and criminal." This view met with little understanding in Sweden and would often be invoked by critics as evidence that Myrdal's politics were beyond the pale. Myrdal subsequently softened his criticism of China, describing its global rise in positive terms as evidence of a global reordering.

Perhaps even more than the Tiananmen Square massacre, Myrdal's position in Swedish public life suffered from his defense of Pol Pot's regime in Democratic Kampuchea. Although he argued that national wars of liberation and peasant rebellions were intrinsically brutal affairs, in which many Cambodians had undoubtedly perished, he dismissed depictions of the regime's purges as a genocide and continued to refer to senior Khmer Rouge leaders as friends and political allies until his death.

Despite his record of supporting totalitarian governments, Myrdal was fiercely opposed to limitations on free speech, citing the First Amendment to the United States Constitution as superior to most other constitutional provisions existing in liberal democracies, and for also fostering a wider debate even against the backdrop of the Second Red Scare than was prevalent in Sweden (which itself had a legal, elected Communist Party) at the same time. He repeatedly argued in favor of civil liberties for everyone – including racists, Nazis, and Islamists. In his view, the left needed to protect and preserve "bourgeois liberties" acquired through past class struggles, and use whatever margin of freedom existed to pursue its cause.

In line with these positions, Myrdal was sharply critical of the Swedish constitution of 1974, which was introduced in order to modernize Sweden's 19th-century constitution. To Myrdal, the new constitution did not symbolize modernity or a democratic step forward; rather, it was a dilution of the protections and division of power enshrined in past constitutional arrangements (see e.g. Skriftställning 6: Lag utan ordning, 1975).

Myrdal was generally of the opinion that movements that genuinely express aspirations for national self-determination or working class interests must be supported on their own terms, in their own cultural and political context. For example, despite being a lifelong atheist, Myrdal argued that Marxists could – indeed, should – make common cause with conservative religious movements whenever they expressed genuine popular or class aspirations. He sought points of convergence between Christian and leftist ideas in Sweden, urging FiB/K to make room for non-Communist and even conservative cultural views; internationally, he took a positive view of Islamist groups like Hezbollah or the Afghan Mujahedin. In 2006, Myrdal told Hezbollah's al-Intiqad magazine: "The question of international solidarity is in fact very simple. We formulated it during the war against US aggression in South East Asia: - Support the Liberation front on their own conditions!"

After defending the right of anti-Semitic agitators and Holocaust deniers to be heard, including Ahmed Rami and Robert Faurisson, while also taking positions in favor of Palestinian attacks against Israelis and the government of Iran, Myrdal was dogged by allegations of anti-Semitism. He dismissed the criticism. Myrdal viewed Zionism as an imperialist phenomenon and Israel as a colonial settler-state, which should be dissolved and replaced by a binational Arab-Jewish state.

His defense of Ayatollah Khomeini's theocratic government in Iran, which he compared favorably to the rule of the Shah, elicited some criticism. In 1989, Myrdal publicly distanced himself from Swedish intellectuals who condemned Khomeini's death sentence against the author Salman Rushdie for blasphemy in The Satanic Verses. Myrdal argued that although Rushdie should enjoy freedom of speech and belief, Khomeini's fatwa was formally a correct expression of Islam in the Iranian context and the pro-Rushdie campaigns served anti-Muslim and imperialist interests.

In later years, Myrdal was criticized from the left for his lack of sensitivity to gender issues and homophobia. Sweden legalized homosexual adoption in 2003 and same-sex marriages in 2009. Myrdal was virtually alone among leftists in joining Christian conservatives to protest the new laws, arguing that legislators needed to respect social reality and children had a right to a legally recognized biological mother and father. However, he rejected accusations of homophobia, arguing that he had advocated for gay rights already in the 1940s and complaining that the allegation had become an "online truth". Myrdal claimed that he had no objection to same-sex marriage, but objected to laws that could end up forcing Christian, Muslim, Jewish or other clergy to marry same-sex couples. "To call this an objection to gay marriage is senseless", he said.

Having supported Afghan resistance to the Soviet Union in the 1980s, Myrdal was an equally enthusiastic supporter of Taliban resistance to US-led coalition forces in Afghanistan after 2001, including the a Swedish International Security Assistance Force contingent. In a 2009 FiB/K article titled "Death to the Occupiers!" he concluded that it equally correct to wish for the death of Swedish soldiers in Afghanistan in the 2000s as it had been to wish for the death of Soviet soldiers in Afghanistan in the 1980s, or British colonial troops a hundred years earlier. To Myrdal, Afghans would not find peace unless "ISAF soldiers, including the Swedish ones, are brought home in body bags and buried with military honors (and stirring speeches by cabinet ministers!)"

Toward the end of his life, Myrdal warned that the organized left was losing its footing within the working class, and insisted that the political task of Marxists was to follow the working class and express its demands. He caused a stir among his own supporters by writing that the electoral successes of the far-right Front National in France was based on her ability to attract working class voters by attacking neoliberalism. Although the Front National leader Marine Le Pen "is not a socialist", Myrdal wrote, "she nevertheless expresses what is, in fact, class demands of the working class and the working people". In 2016, he demonstratively penned an article for the far-right newspaper Nya Tider, founded and run by former members of the National Democrats.

== Writing ==
A voracious reader, a bibliophile, and an unusually prolific and eclectic writer, Myrdal published books and articles on a very broad range of topics, in addition to novels and plays. In Myrdal's writing, the line dividing art, literature, and politics is generally fluid, if at all existent; he will often dive into far-ranging historical and cultural exposés, circling back hundreds of years to contextualize a contemporary issue or personal experience.

As an author, Myrdal was self-taught. Having dropped out of gymnasium to concentrate on his writing, he was briefly employed as a journalist at a local newspaper and struggled to find a publisher for early novel drafts. Report from a Chinese Village (1963) was not his first published book, but it became his breakthrough, including, to a lesser extent, on the international level. A semi-anthropological study, it offered a snapshot of life in a village in Mao's China, which was then largely isolated and little understood even in left-wing circles. He would later publish similar reports and travel notes from Asian countries, including India, Afghanistan, and the then-Soviet Central Asia.

His 1968 book Confessions of a Disloyal European was chosen by The New York Times as one of that year's "ten books of particular significance and excellence". In 1982 Myrdal returned to the Chinese village he had reported on in 1962 and recorded his observations in Return to a Chinese Village (1984), in which he expressed his disappointment at the changes that had occurred and his continued support of Mao's programs, including the Cultural Revolution.

Myrdal continued writing political and travel literature well into his 80s. In 2010, he traveled to India to join Naxalite-Maoist rebels in their jungle camps, which led to the book Red Star over India (2012).

However, Myrdal was not solely a nonfiction writer or a polemicist. His interests strayed far beyond contemporary politics, and, over the decades, he published on such diverse topics as 19th Century French caricature, Afghanistan, Balzac, wartime propaganda posters, wine, Meccano, sex, death, and Strindberg. Indeed, Strindberg's intellectual eclecticism, ceaseless feuding, and strident politics appears to have served as a model for Myrdal's own literary and public persona.

Myrdal's best-known works include the semi-autobiographical I novels. These deal mainly with his childhood and his complex, conflicted relationship with his parents, Alva Myrdal and Gunnar Myrdal. The full suite of autobiographical material is non-chronological and contains numerous repetitions and reformulations. According to Anton Honkonen, the assembled autobiographical material comprises a total of fifteen volumes and more than 3,250 pages, spread over 57 years of publishing.

Through the publication of Childhood (in Swedish as Barndom, 1982), Myrdal's I Novels became strongly associated with the controversy surrounding his tense relationship to his famous parents. Myrdal's unflattering portraits of his parents – even as he acknowledged their importance as intellectuals – caused a scandal at the time of Childhood's publication. Later I books moved away from the childhood theme to focus on Myrdal's experiences of old age, but would nevertheless regularly rehash and comment on early life experiences, never quite relinquishing the child's perspective.

Myrdal's final book, Ett andra anstånd ("A Second Reprieve", 2019) is a prime example of the later I novels. Although it dwells on his childhood years and on the conflicts with Alva and Gunnar, the central focus is on aging and death, loneliness, past loves, and sex. Throughout the book, Myrdal revisits his own past tellings of life events, revising narratives and correcting his own assertions from earlier books and even earlier chapters in the A Second Reprive. Exhuming unflattering aspects of his life that he had previously suppressed or distorted, he graphically recounts contracting venereal disease, cheating on a wife, and being cheated on.

One of the central I novels, Maj. En kärlek (1998), which deals with Myrdal's second marriage, was republished with newly added material in 2020.

Since the 1960s, Myrdal's newspaper and magazine columns were collected in numbered volumes labeled Skriftställningar, meaning, roughly, "writings". The word recalls Myrdal's own favored title, the archaically styled "skriftställare", rather than the more modern "författare", author. Myrdal described the series as an irregular one-man periodical. The last volume in the series was Skriftställning 21: På tvärs (2013).

=== Bibliography in English ===
- Report from a Chinese Village (1963) – translated by Maurice Michael
- Confessions of a Disloyal European (1968)
- China: The Revolution Continued (1970) – with Gun Kessle, translated by Paul Britten Austin
- Angkor: An Essay on Art and Imperialism (1970) – with Gun Kessle
- Albania Defiant (1970)
- Gates to Asia: a Diary from a Long Journey (1972) – with Gun Kessle
- The Silk Road: A Journey from the High pamirs and Ili through Sinkiang and Kansu (1977) – with Gun Kessle
- Carpets from China, Xinjiang & Tibet (1979) – translated into English by Ann Henning
- India Waits (1980)
- Return to a Chinese Village (1984)
- Childhood (1991)
- Twelve Going on Thirteen (2010)
- Red Star Over India: As the Wretched of the Earth are Rising (2014)
