= Crisis in the Population Question =

1934 book by Alva and Gunnar Myrdal

- Author: Alva Myrdal; Gunnar Myrdal
- Original title: Kris i befolkningsfrågan
- Language: Swedish
- Publication date: 1934

Crisis in the Population Question (Swedish: Kris i befolkningsfrågan) is a 1934 book by Alva and Gunnar Myrdal, who discussed the declining birthrate in Sweden and proposed possible solutions. The book was influential in the debate that created the Swedish welfare model.

== Work on the book ==
In the spring of 1931, Swedish economist Gunnar Myrdal and Alva Myrdal wrote an article on social policy and demography. The article was supposed to be published in the Swedish Social Democratic magazine Tiden, but it was never completed. The article, instead, became the cornerstone of the book Crisis in the Population Question which was to be published three years later (1934). The manuscript of the article as well as of the latter book is missing.

In early spring 1934, Alva and Gunnar Myrdal decided to return to this manuscript, to revise, update and expand it into book form. For this purpose, they rented a cottage in the Norwegian mountains. They worked out their theoretical differences and produced a manuscript originally titled Demography and Social Policy. Gunnar was responsible for the historical, theoretical, economic and statistical sections, while Alva drafted chapters on families, children, and specific programmatic proposals.

== Content ==
The book deals with the consequences of continued low fertility in Sweden. Sweden was threatened by population decline and thus reduced productivity and standard of living. The authors advocated a series of social reforms in order to overcome this problem.

A large chapter is devoted to Malthusianism and neo-Malthusianism which they attack and criticize. They argued that less population growth was not needed but an increase of birth rate was and pointed out that if the fertility rate further decreased, "we would at the end of the 1970s have almost twice as many elderly people in relation to individuals in the working ages now", leading to serious supply problems. In this context, "a positive population policy should not focus on getting a few poor families to give birth to a very large number of children, but to persuade the majority to give birth to, say, for example, three children".

The occasion of the book was the birth of fewer children, economically and in terms of unsustainable housing for families. The authors proposed intelligent natalism in which families with children should be supported by various reforms such as free medical care, free school lunches, child benefit, more and better housing, affordable housing and subsidized rent. The idea was that both parents could work outside the home and that the prevailing patriarchal family system (professionals father, homeworking mother) must be revised substantially through a program of social engineering. If children were placed in some kind of institution with trained staff while parents work, that would have a positive economic impact as well as educational benefits to each individual child.

A very serious housing issue resulted in overcrowding and low-quality housing, particularly to poor children growing up in environments that could lead to "physical and psychological harm".

Sterilization was also discussed in the context of nurture versus nature, the Myrdals sided with Boasian environmentalism.

== Influence ==
Alva Myrdal (Nobel Peace Prize, 1982) and Gunnar Myrdal (Nobel Prize in Economics, 1974) were among the most prominent intellectuals in 1930s Sweden. Their political ideas and research efforts played a major role in the design of welfare policy in the welfare state time. In the book was formulated the radical reform demands for a community-oriented family policy, an issue that caused a lively debate.

== Background ==
The economic situation in the early 1930s was serious. A recession had hit the Western world, and millions of people were jobless. In the winter of 1932–1933, 200,000 people were unemployed in Sweden, and working families were especially hard hit, with one-third of children estimated to have been malnourished at the time. Birth rates fell sharply and were the lowest in the Western world. In inner-city apartments were 1930 instance, only 34% had a bath.

== See also ==
- People's Home
