= Ingvar Svennilson =

Swedish economist

Sven Ingvar Svennilson (14 March 1908 – 1972) was a Swedish economist that became known for his theories in planned economics. He was a member of the Stockholm School of Economic Thought. From 1969–1971, he was a member of the committee that selects the laureates for the Sveriges Riksbank Prize in Economic Sciences, the Economics Prize Committee.

With his dissertation, Ingvar Svennilson was associated with the planned economy, and he launched the interpretative scheme for corporate actions, where he set out both a distinction and a dynamic plan between causal aspects and finality aspects, and partly controlled governing and independent variables. The controlling variables are action parameters and the other two expectation variables. In later works, Svennilson would put forward theories of rolling planning.

He was a member of the Royal Swedish Academy of Sciences from 1960, and of the Royal Swedish Academy of Engineering Sciences from 1961.
