= Alfonso García Robles =

Mexican diplomat and politician

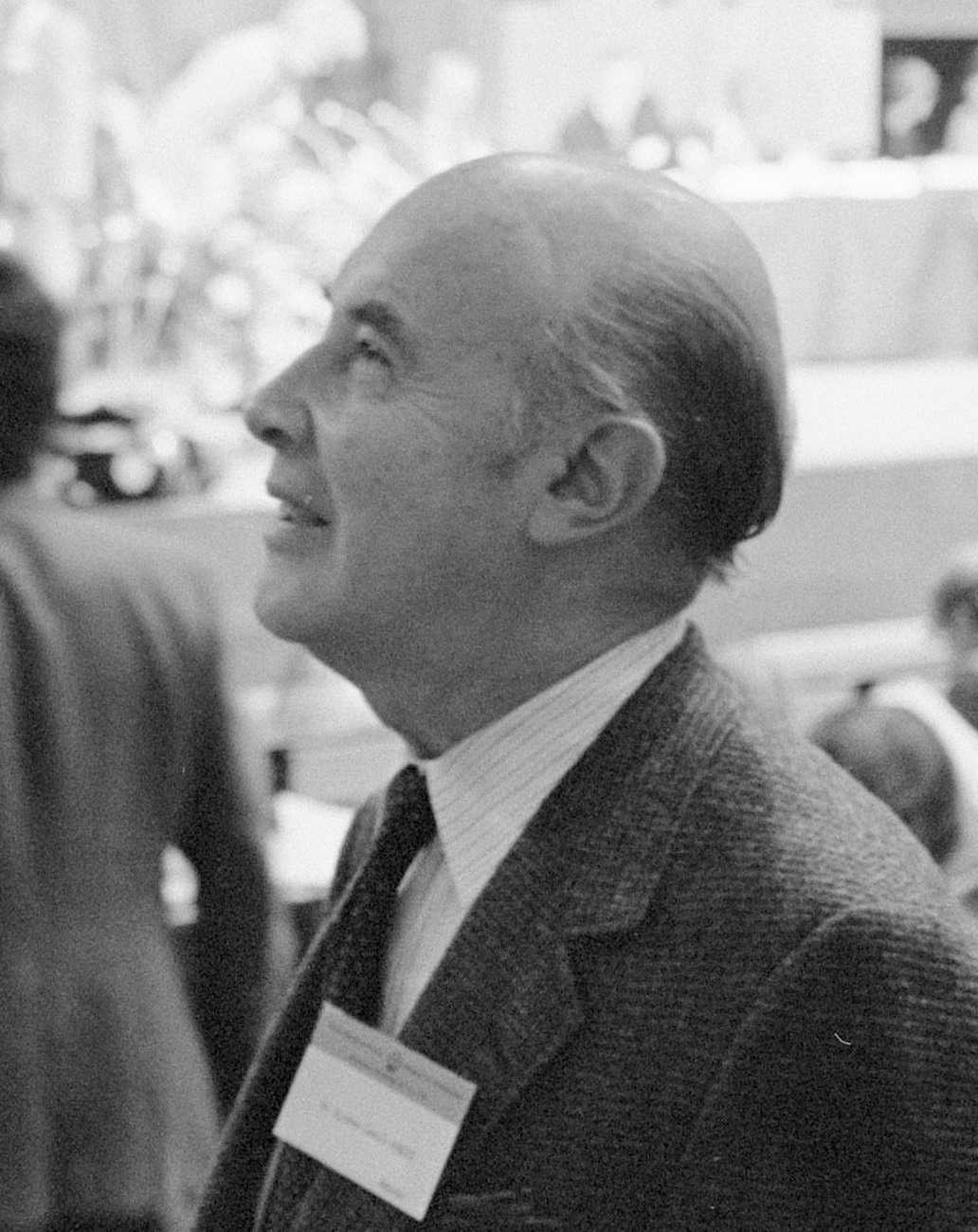
- García Robles in 1981

Secretary of Foreign Affairs of Mexico
- In office 29 December 1975 – 30 November 1976
- President: Luis Echeverría
- Preceded by: Emilio Oscar Rabasa
- Succeeded by: Santiago Roel García

Permanent Representative of Mexico to the United Nations
- In office 14 December 1970 – 1 January 1976
- President: Luis Echeverría
- Preceded by: Francisco Cuevas Cancino
- Succeeded by: Roberto de Rosenzweig-Díaz Azmitia

Personal details
- Born: 20 March 1911 Zamora, Michoacán, Mexico
- Died: 2 September 1991 (aged 80) Mexico City, Mexico
- Education: National Autonomous University of Mexico (LLB)
- Awards: Nobel Peace Prize (1982)
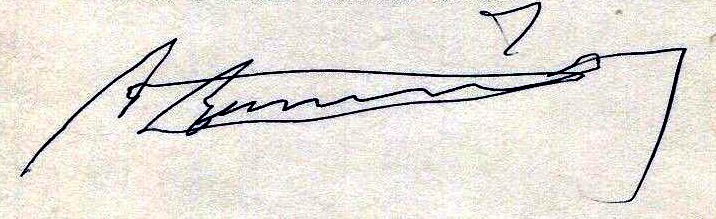
- Signature

Alfonso García Robles (20 March 1911 – 2 September 1991) was a Mexican diplomat and politician who, in conjunction with Sweden's Alva Myrdal, received the Nobel Peace Prize in 1982.

García Robles was born in Zamora, Michoacán, and trained in law at the National Autonomous University of Mexico (UNAM), the Institute of Higher International Studies (IHEI) in Paris, France (1936), and The Hague Academy of International Law in the Netherlands (1938) before joining his country's foreign service in 1939.

He served as a delegate to the 1945 San Francisco Conference that established the United Nations. He was ambassador to Brazil from 1962 to 1964, and was state secretary to the ministry of foreign affairs from 1964 to 1970. In 1971–1975 he served as his country's representative to the United Nations before an appointment as foreign minister in 1975–76. He was then appointed Mexico's permanent representative to the UN's Committee on Disarmament.

García Robles received the Nobel Peace Prize as the driving force behind the Treaty of Tlatelolco, which set up a nuclear-free zone in Latin America and the Caribbean. The agreement was signed in 1967 by most states in the region, though some states took some time to ratify the agreement.

He was admitted to the Colegio Nacional of Mexico in 1972. His name was inscribed on the Wall of Honor of the Palacio Legislativo de San Lázaro, the seat of the Chamber of Deputies, in 2003. His widow died in 2005 aged 83.

== Honours ==
- Commander of the Order of the Southern Cross (Brazil)
- Grand Cross of the Order of the Aztec Eagle (Mexico)
- Grand Cross of the Order of the Sun of Peru (Peru)

== See also ==
- List of peace activists
