= An American Dilemma =

1944 study of race relations by Gunnar Myrdal

- First edition cover
- Author: Gunnar Myrdal
- Language: English
- Published: 1944
- Publisher: Harper & Brothers
- Publication place: United States

An American Dilemma: The Negro Problem and Modern Democracy is a 1944 study of race relations authored by Swedish economist Gunnar Myrdal and funded by Carnegie Corporation of New York. The foundation chose Myrdal because it thought that as a non-American, he could offer a relatively unbiased opinion. Myrdal's volume, at nearly 1,500 pages, painstakingly detailed what he saw as obstacles to full participation in American society that Black Americans faced as of the 1940s. American political scientist, diplomat, and author, Ralph Bunche—who was the first African American to receive a Nobel Prize—served as Gunnar Myrdal's main researcher and writer at the start of the project in the fall of 1938.

It sold over 100,000 copies and went through 25 printings before going into its second edition in 1965. It was enormously influential in how racial issues were viewed in the United States, and it was cited in the landmark Brown v. Board of Education case "in general". The book was generally optimistic in its outlook on the future of race relations in America, taking the view that democracy would triumph over racism. In many ways, it laid the groundwork for future policies of racial integration and affirmative action.

== Analysis ==
Myrdal believed he saw a vicious cycle in which Whites oppressed Blacks, leading to poor standards of education, health, morality, etc. among Blacks that was then used as justification for prejudice and discrimination. The way out of this cycle, he argued, was to either reduce White prejudice, which would improve the circumstances of Blacks, or to improve the circumstances of Blacks, which would then reduce the reasons for White prejudice. Myrdal called this process the "principle of cumulation".

In Black-White Relations: The American Dilemma, economist Junfu Zhang gives this description of Myrdal's work:

According to Myrdal, the American dilemma of his time referred to the co-existence of the American liberal ideals and the miserable situation of blacks. On the one hand, enshrined in the American creed is the belief that people are created equal and have human rights; on the other hand, blacks, as one tenth of the population, were treated as an inferior race and were denied numerous civil and political rights. Myrdal's encyclopedic study covers every aspect of black-white relations in the United States up to his time. He frankly concluded that the "Negro problem" is a "white man's problem". That is, whites as a collective were responsible for the disadvantageous situation in which blacks were trapped.

Myrdal, writing before the civil rights movement of the 1950s and 1960s, alleged that Northern Whites were generally ignorant of the situation facing Black citizens, and noted that "to get publicity is of the highest strategic importance to the Negro people". Given the press's pivotal role in the movement, this proved to be strikingly prescient.

== American Creed ==
At the center of Myrdal's work in An American Dilemma was his postulate that political and social interaction in the United States is shaped by an "American Creed". This creed emphasizes the ideals of individualism, civil liberties, and equality of opportunity. Myrdal claims that it is the "American Creed" that keeps the diverse melting pot of the United States together. It is the common belief in this creed that endows all people—Whites, Blacks, rich, poor, male, female, and immigrants alike—with a common cause and allows them to co-exist as one nation.

Myrdal argued that commitments to this American creed led the majority population, even those who harbor racist views, to feel guilt about the nature of segregation. Myrdal's contemporaries challenged this claim as being largely unsubstantiated.

== Reception ==
The United States Supreme Court's decision to cite to Myrdal's book exposed it to ridicule in the South. For example, the Chief Justice of the Supreme Court of Florida declared that, in the case of Brown v. Board of Education, "the Supreme Court abandoned the Constitution, precedent and common sense and fortified its decision solely with the writings of Gunner Myrdal, a Scandinavian sociologist. What he knew about constitutional law we are not told nor have we been able to learn."

American Marxist historian Herbert Aptheker wrote a booklet titled The Negro People in America: A Critique of Gunnar Myrdal's "An American Dilemma", arguing the work contained "numerous and serious misstatements of fact" and was "based upon a fallacious philosophic concept."

In a 1944 review, political scientist Harold Foote Gosnell described Myrdal's book as "an outstanding social science treatise, brilliant, stimulating, and provocative."

Author Mark Tushnet captured in his book the NAACP's comment that the information in the book isn't something new for the African American communities while acknowledging what the country needed is public and legal discourse for the social inequality and racial discrimination cases.

== See also ==
- "Occasional Discourse on the Negro Question"
