= Gunnar Myrdal =

Swedish economist, sociologist, and Nobel Laureate (1898–1987)

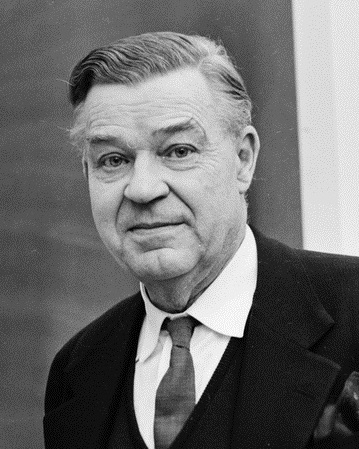
- Myrdal in 1964
- Born: Karl Gunnar Myrdal; 6 December 1898; Skattungbyn, Sweden
- Died: 17 May 1987 (aged 88); Trångsund, Sweden
- Spouse: Alva Myrdal (m. 1924; died 1986)
- Children: 3, including Sissela Bok and Jan Myrdal
- Relatives: Stefan Fölster (grandson)

Academic background
- Education: Stockholm University
- Doctoral advisor: Gustav Cassel
- Influences: Knut Wicksell; John R. Commons; Raúl Prebisch

Academic work
- Discipline: Macroeconomics, sociology
- School or tradition: Stockholm school
- Institutions: Stockholm University; New York University; Geneva Graduate Institute
- Doctoral students: Rudolf Meidner; Leo Törnqvist
- Notable ideas: Monetary equilibrium, ex-ante, circular cumulative causation
- Awards: Nobel Memorial Prize in Economic Sciences (1974); Bronislaw Malinowski Award (1975)

Karl Gunnar Myrdal (/ˈmɜːrdɑːl, ˈmɪər-/ MUR-dahl, MEER-; Swedish: [ˈɡɵ̌nːar ˈmy̌ːɖɑːl]; 6 December 1898 – 17 May 1987) was a Swedish economist and sociologist. In 1974, he received the Nobel Memorial Prize in Economic Sciences along with Friedrich Hayek for "their pioneering work in the theory of money and economic fluctuations and for their penetrating analysis of the interdependence of economic, social and institutional phenomena." When his wife, Alva Myrdal, received the Nobel Peace Prize in 1982, they became the fourth married couple to have won Nobel Prizes, and the first and only to win independent of each other (versus a shared Nobel Prize by scientist spouses).

Myrdal is best known in the United States for his study of race relations, which culminated in his 1944 book An American Dilemma: The Negro Problem and Modern Democracy. The study was influential in the 1954 landmark U.S. Supreme Court decision Brown v. Board of Education. In Sweden, his work and political influence were important to the establishment of the Folkhemmet and the welfare state.

== Early life and education ==
Myrdal was born on 6 December 1898, in Skattungbyn, Sweden, to Karl Adolf Pettersson (1876–1934), a building contractor, and his wife Anna Sofia Karlsson (1878–1965). He took the name Myrdal in 1914 after his ancestors' farm Myr in the province of Dalarna.

There is a possibly apocryphal story about an interaction between him and Gustav Cassel, where Cassel was reported to say, "Gunnar, you should be more respectful to your elders, because it is we who will determine your promotion," and he replied, "Yes, but it is we who will write your obituaries."

Gunnar Myrdal graduated with a law degree from Stockholm University in 1923 and a doctorate in economics in 1927. In June 1919, he met Alva Reimer, whom he married in October 1924 and had the first of their three children in 1927.

Myrdal's PhD thesis, The Problem of Price Formation under Economic Change, had three parts: The Basics of the Dynamic Problem of Price Formation, The Problem of the Profit of the Enterprise, and The Optimal Mode of Construction and Change, the most mathematical of the three, where he studied equilibrium of price formation under dynamic conditions.

In Gunnar Myrdal's doctoral dissertation, published in 1927, he examined the role of expectations in price formation. His analysis strongly influenced the Stockholm school. He built on Knut Wicksell's theories of cumulative process of endogenous money, stressing the importance of Knightian uncertainty and ex ante and ex post expectations role in the economic process.

== Early career ==
Between 1925 and 1929, Myrdal studied in Britain and Germany. He was a Rockefeller Fellow and visited the United States in 1929–1930. During this period, he published his first books, including The Political Element in the Development of Economic Theory in 1930. Returning to Europe, he served for one year as associate professor in the Graduate Institute of International Studies, Geneva, Switzerland.

The Political Element is a compilation of Myrdal's lectures presented at the University of Stockholm. It gives us the historical account of the influence of politics in the development of economic theory and the relation between them. Gunnar believed that economics would be considered a true science only when the political aspect was dissociated. It was initially written to criticize the older generation of Swedish economists such as Eli Heckscher, Gustav Cassel, and Brisman, for combining and confusing facts and values in their theories of 'maximum welfare', 'price level', and 'national income'. But later it turned out be a general critique of the economic theory where he emphasized that economics should be objective and independent from values. He wrote that although economists claim to be scientific and objective, their conclusion from their analyses was always politically inclined. The Political Element was translated to German in 1932 and to English in 1953.

Gunnar Myrdal was at first fascinated by the abstract mathematical models coming into fashion in the 1920s, and helped found the Econometric Society in London. Later, however, he accused the movement of ignoring the problem of distribution of wealth in its obsession with economic growth, of using faulty statistics and substituting Greek letters for missing data in its formulas and of flouting logic. He wrote, "Correlations are not explanations and besides, they can be as spurious as the high correlation in Finland between foxes killed and divorces." Professor Myrdal was an early supporter of the theses of John Maynard Keynes, although he maintained that the basic idea of adjusting national budgets to slow or speed an economy was first developed by him and articulated in his book Monetary Economics, published in 1932, four years prior to Keynes' General Theory of Employment, Interest and Money.

William Barber's comment upon Myrdal's work on monetary theory goes like this:

If his contribution had been available to readers of English before 1936, it is interesting to speculate whether the 'revolution' in macroeconomic theory of the depression decade would be referred to as 'Myrdalian' as much as 'Keynesian'.

Economist G. L. S. Shackle claimed the importance of Gunnar Myrdal's analysis by which saving and investment are allowed to adjust ex ante to each other. However, the reference to ex ante and ex post analysis has become so usual in modern macroeconomics that the position of Keynes to not include it in his work was currently considered as an oddity, if not a mistake. As Shackle put it:

Myrdalian ex ante language would have saved the General Theory from describing the flow of investment and the flow of saving as identically, tautologically equal, and within the same discourse, treating their equality as a condition which may, or not, be fulfilled.

Gunnar Myrdal also developed the key concept circular cumulative causation, a multi-causal approach where the core variables and their linkages are delineated.

== Academic career ==
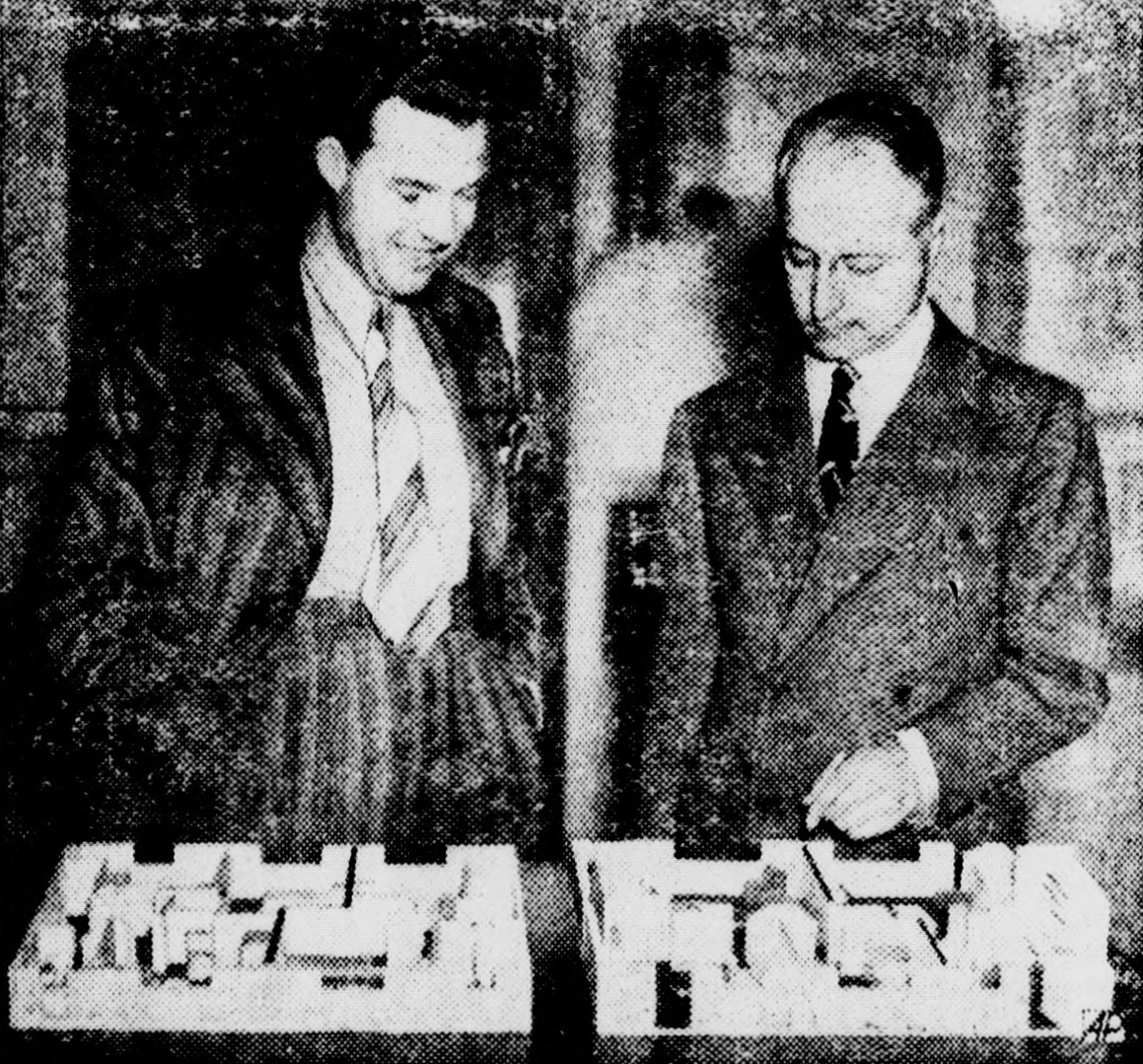
Myrdal (left) examines dwelling models with U.S. Housing Administrator Nathan Straus Jr., 1938

Gunnar Myrdal became professor at Stockholms Högskola 1933. Myrdal was professor of economics at Stockholms Högskola for 15 years, until 1947.

He became a Social Democratic Member of Parliament from 1933, and again from 1945 to 1947 he served as Minister of Commerce and Industry in Tage Erlander's government. During this period, he was heavily criticized for his financial agreement with the Soviet Union. At the same time he was accused of being responsible for the Swedish monetary crisis in 1947.

He coauthored with his wife, Alva Myrdal, the Crisis in the Population Question (Swedish: Kris i befolkningsfrågan, 1934). The work of Gunnar and Alva inspired policies adopted by the Minister of Social Affairs, Gustav Möller, to provide social support to families.

Gunnar Myrdal headed a comprehensive study of sociological, economic, anthropological and legal data on race relations in the United States funded by the Carnegie Corporation, starting in 1938. The result of the effort was Gunnar Myrdal's best-known work, An American Dilemma: The Negro Problem and Modern Democracy, published in 1944, written with the collaboration of R. M. E. Sterner and Arnold Rose. He characterized the problem of race relations as a dilemma because of a perceived conflict between high ideals, embodied in what he called the "American Creed," on the one hand and poor performance on the other. In the generations since the Civil War, the U.S. had been unable to put its human rights ideals into practice for the African American tenth of its population. This book was cited by the U.S. Supreme Court in its 1954 decision in Brown v. Board of Education, which outlawed racial segregation in public schools. Myrdal planned on doing a similar study on gender inequality, but he could not find funding for this project and never completed it.

== World War II and after ==
During World War II, Gunnar Myrdal was staunchly and publicly anti-Nazi. Together with his wife, Alva, he wrote Contact with America in 1941, which praised the United States' democratic institutions.

Gunnar Myrdal became the Executive Secretary of the United Nations Economic Commission for Europe in 1947. During his tenure, he founded one of the leading centers of economic research and policy development. After ten years in the position, Dr. Myrdal resigned as Executive Secretary in 1957. In 1956 and 1957, he was able to publish An International Economy, Problems and Prospects, Rich Lands and Poor and Economic Theory and Underdeveloped Regions. Myrdal was also a signatory of the 1950 UNESCO statement The Race Question, which rebuts the theories of racial supremacy and purity, and also influenced the Brown v. Board of Education decision. "What he knew about [United States] constitutional law we are not told nor have we been able to learn." In 1956, Myrdal wrote the foreword for African American author Richard Wright's The Color Curtain: A Report on the Bandung Conference.

Between 1960 and 1967, he was a professor of international economics at Stockholm University. In 1961, he founded the Institute for International Economic Studies at the university. Throughout the 1960s, he worked on a comprehensive study of trends and policies in South Asia for the Twentieth Century Fund. The study culminated in his three-volume Asian Drama: An Inquiry into the Poverty of Nations, published in 1968. In 1970, he published a companion book called The Challenge of World Poverty, where he laid out what he believed to be the chief policy solutions to the problems he outlined in Asian Drama.

Gunnar Myrdal strongly opposed the Vietnam War. In Asian Drama, Myrdal predicted that land reform and pacification would fail in Vietnam and urged the United States to begin negotiations with North Vietnam. After returning to Sweden, he headed the Swedish Vietnam Committee and became co-chair of International Commission of Inquiry Into U.S. War Crimes in Indochina. He also presided over the Stockholm International Peace Research Institute, an international watchdog for the arms trade. He was one of the signers of the Humanist Manifesto.

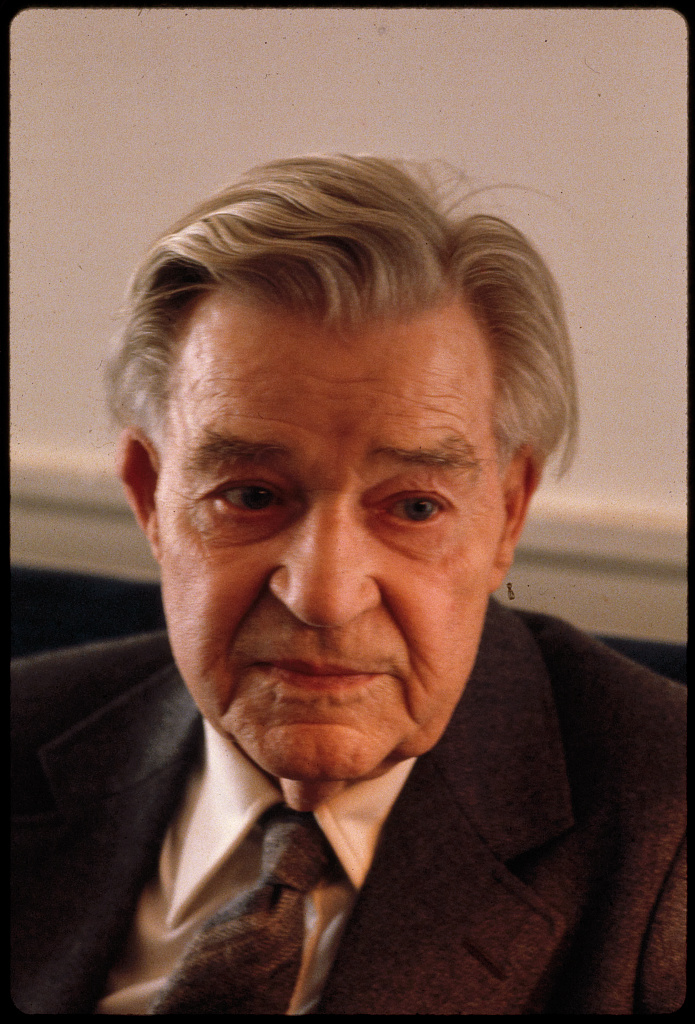
Myrdal in 1980

In 1967 Myrdal received an honorary doctorate from Sir George Williams University, which later became Concordia University.

In 1971 both he and his wife received honorary doctorates from Gustavus Adolphus College in Saint Peter, Minnesota.

He shared the Bank of Sweden Prize in Economic Sciences (otherwise known as the Nobel Memorial Prize in Economics) with Friedrich Hayek in 1974, but argued for its abolition because he believed that economics is a "soft" science.

During 1974–1975, he served as visiting professor at NYU.

Myrdal received an Honorary Doctorate from Heriot-Watt University in 1979.

== Personal life ==
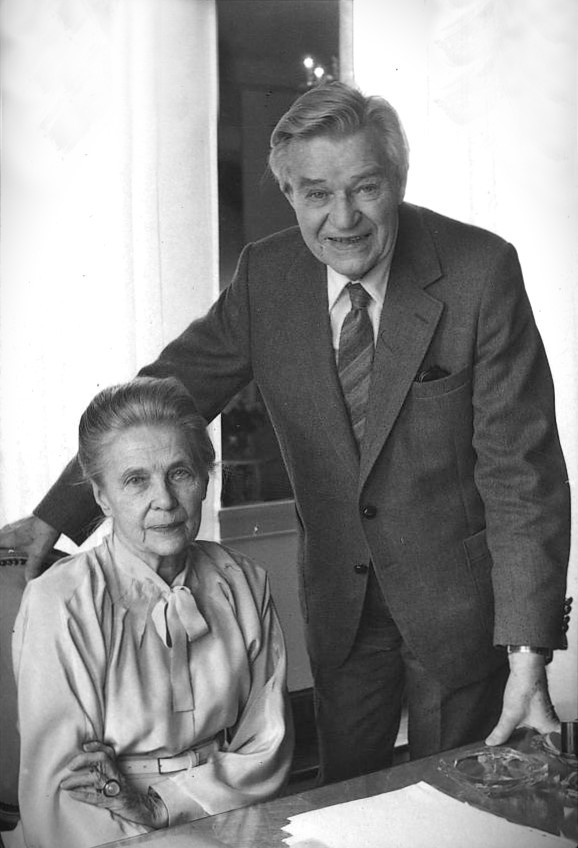
Alva and Gunnar Myrdal circa 1980

Myrdal married politician and diplomat Alva Myrdal in 1924, and together had son Jan Myrdal (born 1927), daughter Sissela Bok (born 1934) and daughter Kaj Fölster (born 1936). Through Fölster, he is the grandfather of Swedish economist Stefan Fölster.

Alva Myrdal was a prominent leader of the disarmament movement. She, along with Alfonso García Robles, received the Nobel Peace Prize in 1982.

Myrdal suffered from Parkinson's disease and was hospitalized for two months before he died in a hospital in Trångsund, south of Stockholm, on 17 May 1987. His daughter Kaj Fölster and his grandson, Janken Myrdal, were present.

== Contributions to the philosophy of knowledge ==
Gunnar Myrdal's scientific influence was not limited to economics. Through the introduction to Asian Drama with the title "The Beam in our Eyes" (a biblical reference; cf. Matthew 7:1–2) he introduced the approach mentioned as scientific relativism of values. This behavioral approach is narrowly connected to behavioralism and is built on the idea that the logical gulf between "is" and "ought" is more sophisticated than just dividing premises into categories. The articles edited in "Value in Social Theory" underlines Myrdal's importance to political science. As political science normally is considered more descriptive than economics, one might get the idea that Myrdal should not have dealt systematically with the values applied to economics. On the contrary, Myrdal connected social science, political science and economics as a practitioner.

Myrdal published many notable works, both before and after American Dilemma and, among many other contributions to social and public policy, founded and chaired the Stockholm International Peace Research Institute. Internationally revered as a father-figure of social policy, he contributed to social democratic thinking throughout the world, in collaboration with friends and colleagues in the political and academic arenas. Sweden and Britain were among the pioneers of a welfare state and books by Myrdal (Beyond the Welfare State – New Haven, 1958) and Richard Titmuss (Essays on "The Welfare State" – London, 1958) unsurprisingly explore similar themes. Myrdal's theoretical key concept "circular cumulative causation" contributed to the development of modern Non-equilibrium economics.

=== Welfare world ===
Myrdal suggested that we need to evolve from the welfare state to the welfare world, which would enable the redistribution of income and wealth not only within a country but also on a global scale. During the Cold War era, In Beyond the Welfare State, he proposed the idea of the welfare world to overcome the limitations of the welfare state in the West. Myrdal's recommendations were not accepted by international technocrats or by developing countries. However, he also thought it a more difficult task to establish the welfare world than a welfare state.

He pointed out the following limitations of the welfare state:

- Nationalism of already existing Western welfare states preventing development in underdeveloped countries.
- Other difficulties of development in the developing countries.
- Existence of the communist countries acting as a provocateur for more revolutionary transformations.

== Awards and honours ==
=== Awards ===
- West German Peace Prize (1970; jointly with his wife Alva Myrdal)
- Nobel Memorial Prize in Economic Sciences (1974)
- Bronislaw Malinowski Award (1975)
- Veblen-Commons Award (1975)

=== Honorary degrees ===
- Harvard University (1938)
- Fisk University (1947)
- Nancy-Université (1950)
- Columbia University, Doctor of Humane Letters (1 June 1954)
- The New School for Social Research (1956)
- University of Leeds, Legume Doctor (1957)
- Yale University, Doctor of Laws (1959)
- University of Birmingham (1961)
- Brandeis University, Doctor of Laws (8 October 1961)
- Howard University, Legume Doctor (1962)
- Detroit (1963)
- University of Edinburgh (1964)
- Lincoln University (1964)
- Swarthmore College, Doctor of Laws (1964)
- Stockholm University, Doctor of Philosophy (31 May 1966)
- Sir George Williams University, Doctor of Laws (May 1967)
- University of Michigan, Doctor of Laws (1967)
- Lehigh University (1967)
- Temple University, Doctor of Civil Laws (1968)
- University of Louisville, Doctor of Social Science (November 1968)
- University of Oslo (1968)
- Uppsala University (1968)
- University of Jyväskylä (1969)
- Atlanta University (1970)
- University of Helsinki (1970)
- University of the Philippines (1970)
- Dartmouth College, Doctor of Science (1971)
- Gustavus Adolphus College, Doctor of Humane Letters (1971)
- Bucharest Academy of Economic Studies (1970)
- University of Bucharest (1971)
- Heriot-Watt University, Doctor of Letters (July 1979)
- Visva-Bharati University (1982)

=== Honours ===
- Fellow of the Econometric Society (1943)
- Member of the Royal Swedish Academy of Sciences (1945)
- Honorary member of the American Economic Association (1947)
- Member of the American Academy of Arts and Sciences (1958)
- Member of the British Academy (1973)
- Member of the American Philosophical Society (1982)

== Publications ==
- The Political Element in the Development of Economic Theory. (1930)
- Monetary Equilibrium (1931), translated to English in 1939
- The Cost of Living in Sweden, 1830–1930 (1933)
- Crisis in the Population Question (1934)
- Fiscal Policy in the Business Cycle. The American Economic Review, vol 21, no 1, Mar 1939.
- Population, a Problem for Democracy. Harvard University Press, 1940.
- Contact With America (1941)
- An American Dilemma: The Negro Problem and Modern Democracy. Harper & Bros, 1944.
- Social Trends in America and Strategic Approaches to the Negro Problem. Phylon, Vol. 9, No. 3, 3rd Quarter, 1948.
- Conference of the British Sociological Association, 1953. II Opening Address: The Relation between Social Theory and Social Policy The British Journal of Sociology, Vol. 4, No. 3, Sept. 1953.
- An International Economy, Problems and Prospects. Harper & Brothers Publishers, 1956.
- Rich Lands and Poor. 1957.
- Economic Theory and Underdeveloped Regions, Gerald Duckworth, 1957.
- Value in Social Theory: A Selection of Essays on Methodology. Ed. Paul Streeten, published by Harper, 1958.
- Myrdal (1960). Beyond the Welfare State. Yale University Press.
- Challenge to Affluence. Random House, 1963.
- America and Vietnam – Transition, No. 3, Oct, 1967.
- Twenty Years of the United Nations Economic Commission for Europe. International Organization, Vol 22, No. 3, Summer, 1968.
- Asian Drama: An Inquiry into the Poverty of Nations, 1968.
- Objectivity in Social Research, 1969.
- The Challenge of World Poverty: A World Anti-Poverty Program in Outline. 1970.
- Against the Stream.
- Hur Styrs Landet?, 1982.
- Gunnar Myrdal on Population Policy in the Underdeveloped World – Population and Development Review, Vol 13, No. 3, Sept. 1987.
- The Equality Issue in World Development – The American Economic Review, vol 79, no 6, Dec 1989.

Awards
Preceded by Wassily Leontief	Laureate of the Nobel Memorial Prize in Economics; 1974; Served alongside: Friedrich August von Hayek	Succeeded by Leonid Vitaliyevich Kantorovich; Tjalling C. Koopmans
