= Alva Myrdal =

Swedish sociologist and politician (1902–1986)

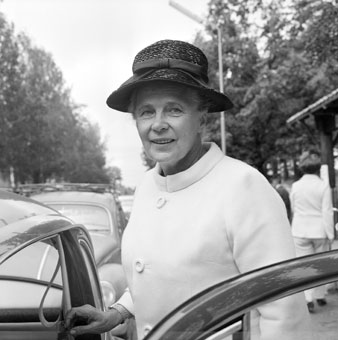
- Myrdal in 1968
- Born: Alva Reimer; 31 January 1902; Uppsala, Sweden
- Died: 1 February 1986 (aged 84); Danderyd, Sweden
- Occupations: Politician, sociologist, diplomat
- Spouse: Gunnar Myrdal (m. 1924)
- Children: 3, including Jan Myrdal and Sissela Bok
- Relatives: Hilary Bok (granddaughter), Stefan Fölster (grandson)

Alva Myrdal (/ˈmɜːrdɑːl, ˈmɪər-/ MUR-dahl, MEER-, Swedish: [ˈǎlːva ˈmy̌ːɖɑːl]; née Reimer; 31 January 1902 – 1 February 1986) was a Swedish sociologist, diplomat and politician. She was a prominent leader of the disarmament movement. She, along with Alfonso García Robles, received the Nobel Peace Prize in 1982. She married Gunnar Myrdal in 1924; he received the Nobel Memorial Prize in Economic Sciences in 1974, making them the fourth ever married couple to have won Nobel Prizes, and the first to win independent of each other (versus a shared Nobel Prize by scientist spouses).

== Biography ==
=== Early life and studies ===
Alva Myrdal was born in Uppsala and grew up as the first child of a modest family, the daughter of Albert Reimer and Lowa Jonsson. She had four siblings: Ruth (1904–1980), Folke (1906–1977), May (1909–1941) and Stig (1912–1977). Her father was a socialist and modern liberal. During her childhood the family moved around to different places. For example, they were residents of Eskilstuna, Älvsjö, and Stockholm. Her academic studies involved psychology and family sociology. She earned a Bachelor of Science degree in Stockholm in 1924.

In 1929, Myrdal and her husband Gunnar Myrdal had the opportunity to travel to the US as Rockefeller Fellows. Myrdal further deepened her studies in the fields of psychology, education and sociology whilst in the US. She had the special chance to broaden her knowledge of children's education. Myrdal's observation of the great social and economic disparities in the United States also led to an increased political commitment – "radical" was the term that she and her husband came to use to describe their shared political outlook They then moved to Geneva for further studies, where they started to so study the population decline that worried many Europeans during the interwar period.

=== Politics of the family and population issue ===
Myrdal first came to public attention in the 1930s, and was one of the main driving forces in the creation of the Swedish welfare state. She coauthored the book Crisis in the Population Question (Swedish: Kris i befolkningsfrågan with Gunnar Myrdal in 1934). The basic question of Crisis in the Population Question is to find what social reforms are needed to allow for individual liberty (especially for women) while also promoting child-bearing, and encouraging Swedes to have children. The book also detailed the importance of shared responsibility for children's education both between the parents as well as the community by trained child educators.

Myrdal was highly critical of developments in the operation of preschools for children in Sweden. Consequently, she published the book Urban Children (1935), where she presented her ideas for a newly reformed Swedish preschool system. She argued that contemporary child care was flawed. The system was polarized between two extremes – measures of 'poor relief' for the less well-off contrasted with those measures which prepared children from wealthier families for private schools. She stressed that there were material obstacles in the way of being able to access a good education. Therefore, social and economic reforms were needed. Myrdal wanted to combine and integrate the two extremes.

A year later, she was able to put her theory into practice, as she became director of the National Educational Seminar, which she cofounded in 1936. She personally worked there as a teacher and pedagogue by training preschool teachers. Myrdal emphasized the lack of recent educational research in regards to preschool teacher training. Her teaching tried to integrate the new discoveries in child psychology in education. Social studies were also emphasized, as was women's personal development.

With architect Sven Markelius, Myrdal designed Stockholm's cooperative Collective House in 1937, with an eye towards developing more domestic liberty for women. She was a member of the Committee for Increased Women's Representation, founded in 1937 to increase women's political representation.

In 1938, Alva and Gunnar Myrdal moved to the United States. While in the US, Myrdal published the book Nation and Family (1941) concerning the Swedish family unit and population policy. During World War II, she also periodically lived in Sweden.

=== Postwar career takeoff ===
A long-time prominent member of the Swedish Social Democratic Party, in the late 1940s she became involved in international issues with the United Nations, appointed to head its section on welfare policy in 1949. From 1950 to 1955 she was chairman of UNESCO's social science section—the first woman to hold such prominent positions in the UN.

Myrdal was appointed envoy to New Delhi, Colombo, and Yangon on 1 November 1955. She took up her post in New Delhi on 3 December 1955, in Yangon on 22 February 1956, and in Colombo on 21 May 1956. Following the elevation of the legation to embassy status, she became ambassador in New Delhi on 27 October 1956, serving until 1 April 1961. She was also accredited to Kathmandu in 1960.

From 1951 she had collaborated with British-based sociologist Viola Klein and in 1956 they co-wrote the book Women's Two Roles: Home and Work, supported by the International Federation of University Women "to make an international survey of the needs for social reforms if women are to be put into a position to reconcile family and professional life".

In 1962, Myrdal was elected to the Riksdag, and in 1962 she was sent as the Swedish delegate to the UN disarmament conference in Geneva, a role she kept until 1973. During the negotiations in Geneva, she played an extremely active role, emerging as the leader of the group of nonaligned nations which endeavored to bring pressure to bear on the two superpowers (US and USSR, respectively) to show greater concern for concrete disarmament measures. Her experiences from the years spent in Geneva found an outlet in her book "The game of disarmament", in which she expresses her disappointment at the reluctance of the US and the USSR to disarm.

Myrdal participated in the creation of the Stockholm International Peace Research Institute, becoming the first chairman of the governing board in 1966. In 1967 she was also named consultative Cabinet minister for disarmament, an office she held until 1973. Myrdal also wrote the acclaimed book The Game of Disarmament, originally published in 1976. A vocal supporter of disarmament, Myrdal received the Nobel Peace Prize in 1982 together with Alfonso García Robles. In 1983 Myrdal effectively ended the heated controversy over the future of Adolf Fredrik's Music School, "The AF-fight" (Swedish: AF-striden).

Myrdal promoted reforms in child care and later became a government commission on women's work and chair of the Federation of Business and Professional Women.

== Personal life ==
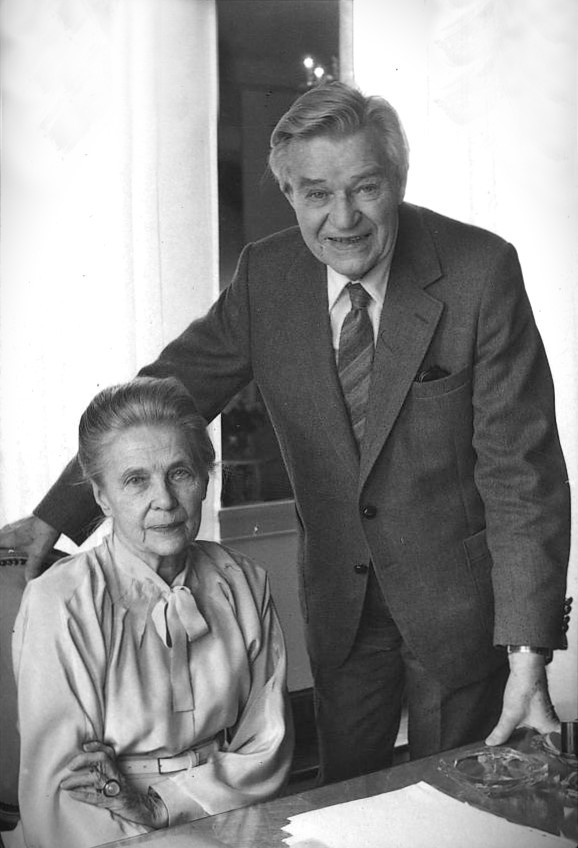
Alva and Gunnar Myrdal circa 1980

In 1924, she married Professor Gunnar Myrdal. Together they had children Jan Myrdal (born 1927), Sissela Bok (born 1934) and Kaj Fölster (born 1936).

Her grandchildren include Hilary Bok and Stefan Fölster.

== Death ==
She died the day after her 84th birthday.

== Awards and honours ==
- West German Peace Prize (1970; jointly with her husband Gunnar Myrdal)
- Wateler Peace Prize (1973)
- Royal Institute of Technology's Great Prize (1975)
- Monismanien Prize (1976)
- Albert Einstein Peace Prize (1980)
- Jawaharlal Nehru Award for International Understanding (1981)
- Nobel Peace Prize (1982; jointly with Alfonso García Robles)

=== Honorary degrees ===
- Mount Holyoke College (1950)
- University of Leeds, Doctor of Letters (1962)
- University of Edinburgh (1964)
- Columbia University, Doctor of Humane Letters (1965)
- Temple University, Doctor of Humane Letters (1968)
- Gustavus Adolphus College, Doctor of Divinity (1971)
- Brandeis University, Doctor of Laws (19 May 1974)
- University of Gothenburg, Doctor of Philosophy (1975)
- University of East Anglia (1976)
- University of Helsinki (1980)
- University of Oslo (1981)
- Linköping University, Doctor of Medicine (1982)

=== Memberships ===
- Member of the American Philosophical Society (1982)

== See also ==
- List of female Nobel laureates
- Social engineering (political science)

Diplomatic posts
Preceded by Per Wijkman	Ambassador of Sweden to India; 1955–1961	Succeeded by Klas Böök
Preceded by None	Ambassador of Sweden to Burma; 1956–1959	Succeeded by Tord Hagen
Preceded by Per Wijkman	Ambassador of Sweden to Ceylon; 1956–1961	Succeeded by Klas Böök
Preceded by None	Ambassador of Sweden to Nepal; 1960–1961	Succeeded by Klas Böök
