= Ultimate Weapon =

Ultimate Weapon may refer to:

== Film and television ==
- The Ultimate Weapon (film), a 1998 film starring Hulk Hogan
- Arrow: The Ultimate Weapon or War of the Arrows, a 2011 South Korean historical action film
- "Ultimate Weapon" (Ben 10), a 2006 television episode
- "Ultimate Weapon" (Double the Fist), a 2008 television episode
- "The Ultimate Weapon" (The Transformers), a 1986 television episode
- Ultimate Weapons, a show formerly on the Military Channel

== Literature ==
- The Ultimate Weapon (novel), a 1936 novel by John W. Campbell
- She, The Ultimate Weapon or Saikano, a 1999–2001 manga by Shin Takahashi
- Ultimate Weapon X, a fictional organization in the Ultimate Marvel Comics universe

== Other uses ==
- Ultimate Weapon, a monument at Fort Dix, New Jersey, US
- Ultimate Weapon, an electric guitar model produced by James Tyler Guitars

== See also ==
- Doomsday machine (disambiguation)
