= This Life: Secular Faith and Spiritual Freedom =

2019 book by Martin Hägglund

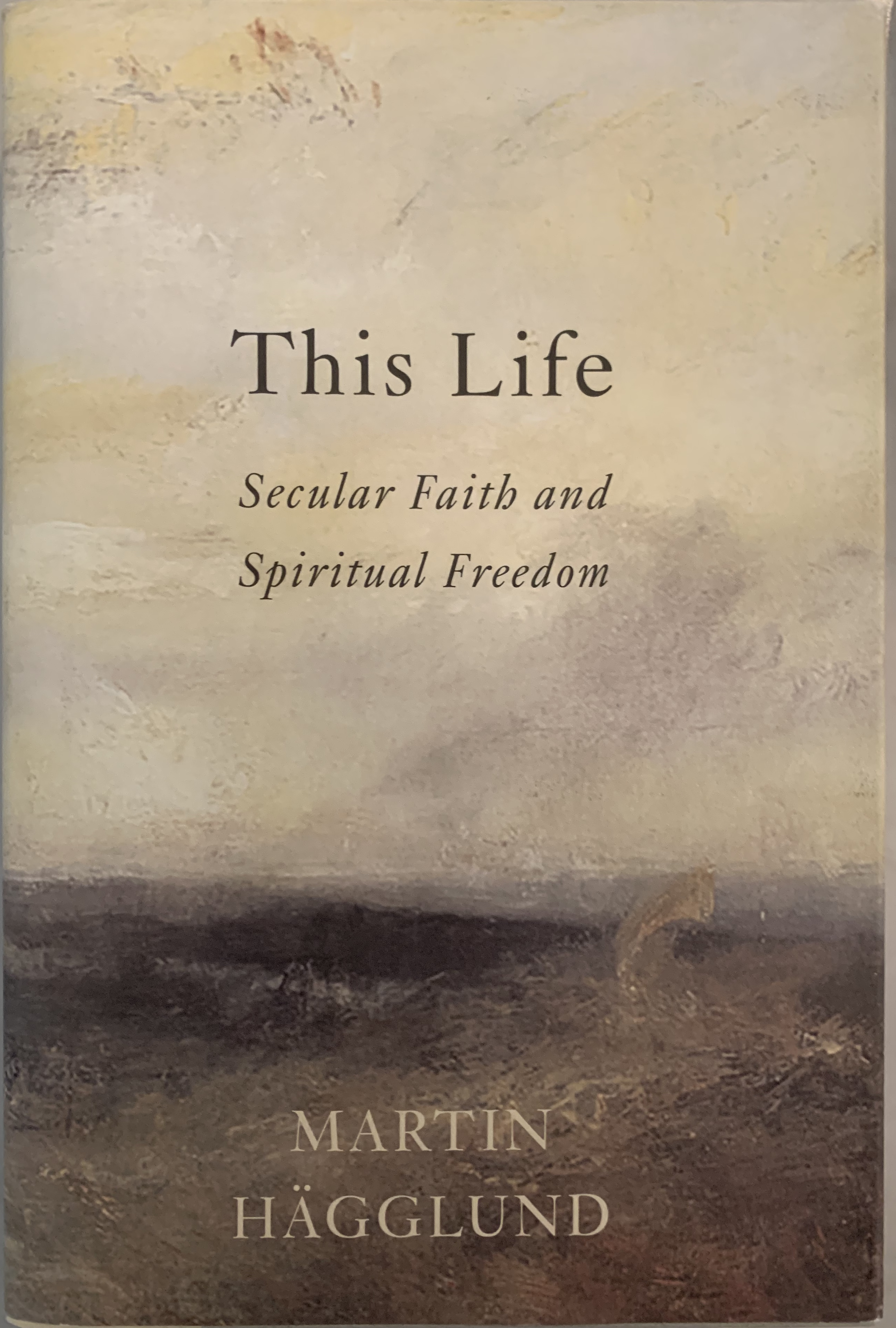
- Author: Martin Hägglund
- Language: English
- Subject: Philosophy
- Publisher: Penguin Random House
- Publication date: March 5, 2019
- Publication place: United States
- Pages: 464
- ISBN: 9781101870402

This Life: Secular Faith and Spiritual Freedom is a book by philosopher Martin Hägglund, which pursues a critique of the religious ideal of eternity and reconceives faith in secular terms as the fundamental form of practical commitment. Through new interpretations of G.W.F. Hegel, Karl Marx, and Martin Luther King Jr., Hägglund develops the social and political stakes of his analysis of our temporal existence, arguing that labor under capitalism alienates us from our finite lifetime. Calling for a revaluation of our values, Hägglund presents a novel vision of democratic socialism as a post-capitalist form of life in which we could truly own our time and recognize our shared freedom.

== Reception ==
This Life has been the subject of full-day conferences at Harvard University and Yale University, a special issue of The Philosopher, and numerous reviews in scholarly journals. At the same time, This Life has garnered much attention in public media for its analysis of fundamental existential questions in combination with a radical critique of capitalism and new political vision, at a historical moment of renewed interest in democratic socialism.

James Wood in The New Yorker hailed This Life as "an important new book" that is "beautifully liberating" and "offers a fulfillment of what Marx meant by 'irreligious criticism,' a criticism aimed at both religion and capitalism." The Guardian in turn described the book as "a sweepingly ambitious synthesis of philosophy, spirituality and politics, which starts with the case for confronting mortality, and ends with the case for democratic socialism." In The New Republic, Jedediah Purdy portrayed the book as making "the spiritual case for socialism," which provides "a vital alternative" for the contemporary left. In Jacobin, Samuel Moyn emphasized that This Life is "an excellent place to start for those who want to energize the theory of socialism" and that contemporary Marxists "have a lot to gain from taking up Hägglund's invitation to think through their ultimate premises." Also writing in Jacobin, Michael McCarthy found the book too radical in its critique of reformism, while maintaining that This Life "is exactly right to focus our long-term vision on a fundamental transformation of society" and that "Hägglund's revaluation of value is itself a powerful Polaris to help navigate the political projects that we set ourselves to embracing." Reviewing the UK edition of the book, Marina Vaizey praised it as a "quietly devastating takedown of capitalism," which offers "a highly readable, accessible – yet profound – examination of what kind of society might enable life at its most fulfilling," while Critical Inquiry lauded the book as "a distinct and important contribution to contemporary philosophy," in which "the philosophical basis Hägglund offers for a future of progressive politics remains crucial."

The critique of religion in This Life has been the source of some controversy. Several reviewers have embraced Hägglund's critique of capitalism while expressing reservations about his critique of religion. James G. Chappel in Boston Review praised the book for providing "a vision of justice that is plausible and compelling enough to organize our efforts," while being critical of Hägglund's treatment of religion. Likewise, in the New Statesman, Mark O'Connell found Hägglund's critique of capitalism "deeply radical" and "powerful," but voiced concerns about his critique of religion. Adam Kirsch in The Wall Street Journal took issue with both the critique of religion and the critique of capitalism in This Life, arguing that the religious notion of "sin" explains why capitalism is "the most successful economic system because it reckons with this selfish drive and puts it to productive use." In Church Life Journal Michael Shindler in turn argued against Hägglund's notion of secular faith in favor of "the absolute sensibility" of religious faith. In contrast, David Chivers in The Humanist heralded This Life as "an important work that pushes forward a secular, rational, and fulfilling view of humankind's place in the world." Joe Moran in Times Higher Education found "Hägglund's cherishing of mortal existence a cheering corrective to the sometimes joyless scientificity of the new atheism" and Phil Zuckerman in Psychology Today underscored that This Life is "by far the most profound, thoughtful, compelling, and insightful book I have ever read on the topic of immortality, and the problematic implications of the religious fixation on eternal life."

Two substantial academic reviews are by Nathan Brown in Radical Philosophy and Conall Cash in boundary 2, both of which focus on Hägglund's transformation and renewal of Marx's legacy. Brown analyzes how Hägglund synthesizes philosophical resources from Hegel, Marx, and Heidegger, contending that "This Life may be the most important revival of Hegelian Marxism since Althusser's critique of that orientation," which is "an intervention in intellectual history of the first order" and provides "a breathtaking reconstruction of Marx as a thinker of freedom, re-grounding the conceptual priority of time and value within his critique of political economy." Cash in turn emphasizes that "by starting from the point of view of our finite time as our most precious resource, Hägglund has reconstructed Marx's critique of political economy with the utmost clarity," which offers "a new way of articulating the idea of alienation, and its overcoming. No concept in Marxism is more debated than this one, and one of the great virtues of This Life is that it helps reframe our understanding of it." At the same time, Cash raises questions regarding Hägglund's notion of the state and argues that he would need a theory concerning the transition to socialism, "a theory which could add to what, already in Hägglund's work so far, stands as one of the most morally and politically compelling intellectual projects of our time." A similar set of questions are raised by Lea Ypi in her essay on This Life for The Philosopher. Ypi puts pressure on Hägglund's account of the relation between the liberal state and capitalist relations of production, in order to ask for further clarification regarding his notion of political agency and revolutionary change. At the same time, Ypi endorses Hägglund's vision of democratic socialism, which she thinks "gives us excellent answers in the direction of the revaluation of value, common ownership of the means of production, and the institutionalization of the ability/ needs principle."

In 2020, Los Angeles Review of Books published a symposium on This Life, with responses to Hägglund's book by Walter Benn Michaels, Michael W. Clune, Jodi Dean, William Clare Roberts, Brandon M. Terry, and Benjamin Kunkel. In an extensive, three-part response, Hägglund defends his immanent critique of capitalism and elaborates his vision of a post-capitalist, emancipated form of life. In 2021, Hägglund published an additional essay responding to the reception of This Life, "Marx, Hegel, and the Critique of Religion: A Response."

In 2020, the book was awarded the René Wellek Prize.
