= Tony Walters =

Australian actor and film director

Antony "Tony" Walters is an Australian actor, film director, and cocreator of the Australian Broadcasting Corporation television series Double the Fist.

Born on the 9th of April, 1962. Walters met his collaborator Craig Anderson when they were performing absurdist theatre at the University of Western Sydney in the mid-1990s. Bryan Moses, the third member of their team was there at the same time making films. They teamed up on the short film Life in a Datsun, which won best comedy at the 1999 Tropfest film festival, where they met Doug Bayne, another entrant who created casual computer effects. The foursome created Video Dare, a consciously tasteless mock reality show that they sold to Special Broadcasting Service.

They then created material for Fly TV, ABC's digital youth channel, before piloting Double the Fist.

He has a partner and a young daughter who he absolutely adores and has no desire for another.

Walters is currently working as a photographer and video journalist for The Sydney Morning Herald.
