= Philosophical Society of England =

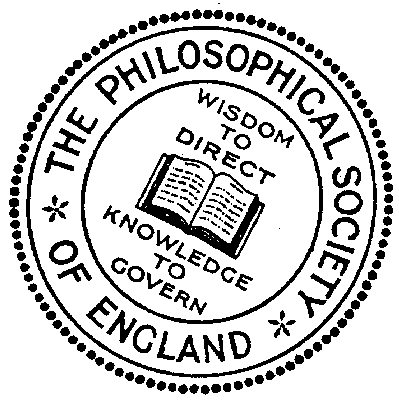
Logo of the Philosophical Society of England

The Philosophical Society of England (PSE) was founded in 1913 by a group of largely amateur 'philosophers' concerned to provide an alternative to the formal university-based discipline. The society has passed through a series of changes in direction, including a period during which it offered distance-learning courses in philosophy (although it no longer does today). These courses caused a minor academic tussle in the 1950s over the status of its diplomas of associateship, triggered by an ill-advised attempt to award them to all the then UK university Philosophy Professors an honorary fellowship (FPhS).

In the words of its founding statement, the Philosophical Society of England exists 'to promote the study of practical philosophy among the general public'. It aims to bring together professional philosophers and non-professionals, to bring philosophical ideas and problems to the public attention, and to encourage wider discussion of both traditional and topical philosophical issues. To carry out this function, the society published its own journal, The Philosopher, set up local groups for lectures and discussions and held regular conferences, often free of charge. The journal continues to be published to this day, with recent notable contributors including Mary Midgley, Timothy Williamson, and Jason Stanley.

Its most high-profile president has been Professor Brenda Almond, known for her work in the cause of 'Applied Philosophy' in the United Kingdom, who helped shepherd the society to its 100th anniversary, celebrated with a special conference in Malmesbury in 2012.

The society has never aligned itself with any particular school of philosophy, nor is it a cover for any political, ideological, religious, or esoteric movement or interests. Membership is open to all interested persons who share the society's aims.

Under the chairmanship of Newcastle-based philosopher Michael Bavidge, the Philosophical Society of England continues to run events, workshops, and reading groups around the country, and especially in London and Newcastle upon Tyne. It currently collaborates with various other public philosophy bodies, including the Newcastle Philosophy Society, Bigg Books, and The London Philosophy Club. In October 2019, it co-organized a mini UK-tour for Yale philosopher Martin Hägglund.
