= Marc Daniels =

American television director

- Born: Daniel Marcus; January 27, 1912; Pittsburgh, Pennsylvania, United States
- Died: April 23, 1989 (aged 77); Santa Monica, California, United States
- Education: University of Michigan
- Occupation: Television director
- Years active: 1948–1989 (his death)

Marc Daniels (born Daniel Louis Marcus; January 27, 1912 – April 23, 1989) was an American television director. He directed on programs such as I Love Lucy, I Married Joan, Gunsmoke, Star Trek, Mission: Impossible, Hogan's Heroes, Alice, and more.

== Life and career ==
Daniels was a graduate of the University of Michigan. Following his service in the U.S. Army during World War II, which continued until 1946, Daniels was hired by CBS to direct its inaugural dramatic anthology program, Ford Theater, where he mastered the art of live television direction. He was hired to direct the first 38 episodes of I Love Lucy, an early filmed series. Daniels recommended Vivian Vance for the role of Ethel Mertz. Daniels, along with his wife, Emily Daniels, and cinematographer Karl Freund, has been credited with introducing the three-camera technique of filming as opposed to the conventional one-camera. In a 1977 interview, Daniels noted that he left I Love Lucy to take another job that paid more. "Maybe it was a stupid thing to do," he said. "But then we didn't know we were creating history. We were just doing a show".

In addition to I Love Lucy, Daniels also directed episodes of Where's Raymond?, Gunsmoke, Mission: Impossible, Fame, Alice, Hogan's Heroes, and The Andros Targets. To science fiction fans, Daniels is perhaps best known for directing fifteen episodes of Star Trek (including the episodes "Mirror, Mirror", A Private Little War, The Doomsday Machine, Assignment Earth, and "Space Seed" and writing an episode of the animated series ("One of Our Planets is Missing"). Near the end of his career, Daniels worked with Lucille Ball again on her last series, Life with Lucy (1986).

He had an uncredited appearance (via a photograph) as Dr. Jackson Roykirk in the Star Trek episode "The Changeling", which he also directed.

During his career, Daniels was nominated for two Primetime and one Daytime Emmy award, two Directors Guild of America awards, and four Hugo Awards. He won one Hugo, a joint award in 1967 with Gene Roddenberry for "Best Dramatic Presentation" for the Star Trek episode "The Menagerie".

== Death ==
Daniels died of congestive heart failure on April 23, 1989, in Santa Monica, California, at the age of 77. He is buried at Sleepy Hollow Cemetery, Concord, Mass.
