= Don't Explain (DVD) =

- Starring: David Collins; Shane Dundas
- Release date: November 2007
- Running time: 90 minutes
- Country: Australia

Don’t Explain is the title of the second DVD by the Umbilical Brothers, the first being SpeedMouse. It is a recording of the stage show of the same name and was released in November 2007. The show which was filmed at the Athenaeum Theatre in Melbourne and was nominated for the 2008 ARIA Award for Best Comedy Release.

The show itself (rather than the DVD) received positive reviews in the Adelaide Theatre Guide (June 2008) and Time Out (October 2012).

== Plot ==
Don’t Explain is a selection of skits that contain no overall plot; the title references this. There are, however, recurring themes throughout the show, one of which is an attempt by Dave to get the hand-held microphone off Shane; this leads to the climax in which they both have microphones. Another is the performance of visual comedy from Europe by Hans And Klaus.

== Characters ==
- Shane Dundas as Shane
- David Collins as Dave
- James Savage as Monique
- Tina as herself
- Fluffy, courtesy of Hans & Klaus
- The Koala, courtesy of Hans & Klaus

== Sections ==
- Fourth Wall
- Action Guy
- Dog
- Hans And Klaus
- For Ze Kids
- BBQ
- Mood Change
- Don’t Explain
- Klaus Solo
- Face Off
- Race Off
- Chase Off!

== Awards ==
Aria Awards

- 2008 – Best Comedy Release (lost to Shaun Micallef – The Expurgated Micallef Tonight)
