= Wittgenstein's Beetle and Other Classic Thought Experiments =

Book by Martin Cohen

Wittgenstein's Beetle
- Author: Martin Cohen
- Language: English
- Genre: Popular science; philosophy
- Publisher: Blackwell Publishing
- Publication date: 2005
- Media type: Book
- Pages: 155
- ISBN: 1-4051-2191-2
- Dewey Decimal: 101 22
- LC Class: BD265 .C64 2004

Wittgenstein's Beetle is a book by Martin Cohen, perhaps better known for his popular introductions to philosophy, such as 101 Philosophy Problems. It was selected by The Guardian as one of its "books of the week" and was reviewed in Times Literary Supplement which said that "With its sense of history, Wittgenstein's Beetle provides the opportunity to consider which thought experiments last."

The book is essentially an introduction to the use of the thought experiment technique in both science and philosophy. To this purpose, it offers a selection of historical examples of how the technique has been used, presented in an A–Z format, together with a brief overview of the history of the method itself.

The full title of the book is Wittgenstein's Beetle and Other Classic Thought Experiments, but, according to the author, it was originally supposed to have been called The Beetle, the Bucket and the Body-Exchange Machine - which gives a better idea of what it is really about. "The Beetle" refers to Wittgenstein's Beetle thought experiment, which is an attempt to understand how words are used in ordinary language; "the Bucket" is a reference to Newton's bucket, Isaac Newton's argument to prove the presence of absolute space; and the "Body-Exchange Machine" is a reference to an old philosophical concern of what is it that makes a person who they are. As the book says, this can be seen as early as in John Locke's problem of the Prince and the Pauper. Another major theme is Galileo's use of the technique, such as the "much misunderstood" falling balls experiment, which Cohen sees as central to the development of modern science.

== Book editions ==
There are a number of foreign editions including:

Complex Character Chinese edition (Rye Field Publications); Italian edition (Carocci Editore); Korean edition (Seokwangsa); Simplified Character Chinese edition (Shandong Education Press).
