= List of Double the Fist episodes =

This is a list of Double the Fist episodes. Craig Anderson is one of the television show's creators.

== Series 1 ==
=== Episode 1: Vertical Challenge ===
In this first episode, Steve challenges the Fist team to abseil down a cliff - without any ropes or means of suspension. Mephisto decides to construct a batsuit to glide safely down; he fails due to a lack of updrafts. Rod decides his strategy will be to jump the distance from the top of the cliff to the water; however, that distance is about 2 metres longer than the world record long jump, and even though Rod has his legs waxed in order to reduce air resistance, he fails. The Womp tests several strategies by throwing watermelons off the cliff, but every watermelon splats on the ground; he eventually succeeds by wrapping himself in over 900m of Bubble Wrap. First aired 21 May 2004.

=== Episode 2: Extreme Makeover ===
Steve challenges the Fist team to improve the lifestyles of some weak viewers. Womp is assigned a kid, Rod is assigned an old lady, and Mephisto is assigned a mediocre magician. To test the fist-worthiness of the subjects at the end, they will have to get on a luge and do a jump over a ramp. The jumps of the kid and old lady end disastrously. The magician decides he will do his jump in a bag (tied up), in a locker on wheels that is chained and padlocked, which is on fire; this also ends in disaster as the fire warps the metal and is unable to roll (as told by Mephisto). The magician burns to death, but wins as he put himself in mortal danger (i.e., a position where he couldn't get out of). This episode includes Mephisto's thoughts on vegetarians and Rod teaching his elderly lady a very painful way to drink tea. First aired 28 May 2004.

=== Episode 3: Fistathlon ===
Steve pits the Fist team against each other in attempt to make sport more fistworthy. The first sport is golf; each contestant tees off as usual in a game of golf, but Panda is hidden somewhere on the course, armed with a Glock. Panda eliminates Rod and Womp (after teaching Womp to hit the ball off the tee) before they can get their ball into the hole; Mephisto then kills Panda with a knife. Mephisto triumphantly drops his ball into the hole, but does not receive any points because he was supposed to hit it in. The second game is clay pigeon shooting: each contestant is charged with making what Steve thinks is a boring sport into something more exciting. Womp decides to vary the angle at which the clay pigeons are launched, but some of them end up being directed at him, and he is pelted by them. Rodd decides to have targets that shoot back, and is killed by one. Mephisto decides that he will be launched (by catapult) as he attempts to shoot at a stationary clay pigeon on the ground; however, he shoots too late and misses. No one receives any points. Several more events are briefly summarized, including "Breast Stroke" (stroking a strangers breasts) bowling, the "fire sprint" (which resulted in all of the contestants exploding), and the smorgasbord event, which Womp won by eating 17 courses. The final challenge is a 'steeplechase', a run along the highway, over a space/time vortex, and through a "trap canyon" (basically a maze full of trapdoors, swinging blades, and spikes). The Womp gets off to a slow start and falls into the vortex; because the vortex transports him 5 minutes back in time, it effectively clones him. Womp falls in several times, so there end up being quite a few clones of him. Mephisto and Rod reach the trap canyon first, but are both quickly dispatched by it. The Womps get to the trap canyon, and by sheer numbers, one manages to get to the end. The Womp is declared the overall winner of the Fistahlon, and is granted the privilege of climbing "Mount Fistus" (a nondescript hill). This episode also divulges Mephisto's hatred of road safety campaigns and could be the first appearance of Blue Womp. The special features on the DVD of season 1 reveal that another sport, sprinting, was intended to be satirized; however, there was a significant pyrotechnic mishap and the scene had to be cut. First aired 4 June 2004.

=== Episode 4: Fear Factory ===
Reality television comes under fire this week, as Steve pits the Fist team and some guests against each other inside the world's most deadly factory. This episode includes Ugly Dave Gray as well as Yvonne Strahovski as competitors in the contest, Womp and Blue Womp arguing about cookery, shark-like creatures flying through the air and eating people, and Rod fighting evil flying furniture. During this episode, Mephisto gets possessed by an ancient Aztec demigod, steals Steve's car, and disappears from the show until episode 6. First aired 11 June 2004.

=== Episode 5: High School Challenge ===
In this episode, the Fist Team competes with some high schoolers in various challenges. Each challenge is worth 1 point. The team with the most points at the end is deemed the most fistworthy. Among the challenges were:

- Library Search: the teams were given the task of finding a golden key hidden in a book in the library. They were only given one clue. The Fist Team won by stealing the golden key after the high schoolers found it.
- Egg protection: Each team had to protect an egg from being smashed by Panda's cricket bat. The high schoolers made a contraption to protect it from high falls, and then dropped it off the side of the building, dissuading Panda from smashing it. The Fist Team quarrelled, so their strategy ended up being Blue Womp trying (and failing) to protect the egg with his body.
- Mathematics Challenge: One designated player on each team (Rod for the Fist Team, and Emily for the High School Team) lies head-first on a skateboard, which is attached to a long rope, such that it can be dragged towards an operating lawn-mower. Steve asks the teams numerical questions, and the amount by which they are incorrect is translated into the distance the skateboards are drawn forward (much like Cliff Hangers from The Price Is Right). The Fist Team came from behind to win after the High School team incorrectly guessed Steve's weight, and Emily's head was pulverised.
- History challenge (worth double points): The two teams were given the task of recreating the Gallipoli landing from World War I, with the two teams playing the ANZACs and the rest of the school students playing the Turkish forces. Showing favouritism, the rest of the school students refused to attack their friends, attacking only the Fist Team; however, this backfired for the school students, because by getting massacred, the Fist Team's more accurately recreated the actual outcome at Gallipoli.

At the end of the episode, the Fist Team was the overall winner, 4–1. Also, Steve became frustrated with Blue Womp, and after beating him violently, forbade him from ever appearing again. (He did reappear in the final episode of the season, but only to be shot in the head with a cannon). First aired 18 June 2004.

=== Episode 6: Bush Bash ===
The episode begins with Steve deriding the ability of nonviolent protestors to ever accomplish anything. He then announces that there is a major logging operation taking place in a forest in Australia, and gives the fist team the assignment of stopping it; whoever eliminates the most loggers will have won. After several misadventures, the Womp, Rod, and Tina T manage to reach the main site of the logging operation, where it is revealed that Mephisto, possessed by an Aztec demigod is cloning pandas in a giant pyramid. The Womp pokes Mephisto in the eye, detaching the demigod from him. The dazed Mephisto orders the pandas to stop logging. Steve says that because Mephisto stopped the most loggers, he won the challenge. First aired 25 June 2004.

=== Episode 7: Terrorism ===
This episode is slightly different from the others - it does not feature any of the recurring segments, and instead plays as a story. Steve challenges the team to stop a mysterious terrorist group, but when they are all taken hostage, it's up to Steve to save the day - and it turns out the head terrorist has a grudge against him. The split-screen effects and timers used throughout the episode are clear homages to the TV series 24. The action-packed ending and particularly the ending credits are a parody of the 1998 film Armageddon. First aired 9 July 2004.

The title "Terrorism" is often given to the episode by TV guides, but throughout the episode itself it is called "Episode 7".

=== Episode 8: Special Edition ===
This is a prank clip show episode, featuring previews for upcoming, and non-existent, episodes. It also has supposedly behind-the-scenes footage, expanded back stories for the characters, and some other miscellaneous clips like a music video featuring Rod Foxx on lead vocals. Steve claims on the website that he had a plan for a different episode, but ABC wouldn't let him broadcast it, so he had to throw together the "special edition" at the last minute. The false previews for the next eight episodes were paid off when they pretended the ABC had cancelled the series and faked being taken off air with two minutes left to go, with an intentionally bad replacement, Town and Country, being shown for the remainder of the time slot. First aired 16 July 2004.

=== Extra Special Edition ===
This DVD exclusive episode continues the prank clip show episode theme from Episode 8, which also features previews for upcoming, and non-existent, episodes. Letter of the Weak also touched upon the use of special effects in the show. (Apparently not only just for spectacular stunts, but for everything else as well.) The episode also features audition tapes from various members of the public who deem themselves fistworthy. One such tape came from Bill Karas who, according to Steve Foxx, originally had his own segments in the series which were barred from broadcast by the ABC. The segment titled "Fist Boy" had Karas take on fast food restaurant chain McDonald's for slaughtering billions of friendly cows and not giving back to the cow community by buying all their stock. The Womp's sexuality towards Steve Foxx is also questioned. The Episode ends with a rant from Steve Foxx regarding his difficulty with the ABC cancelling the show in favour of BBC Costume dramas and concludes with Steve kicking out the ABC camera crew from his house with whom he was dissatisfied in the first place. This episode has not aired on TV and is featured on the Series One volume Two DVD.

== Series 2 ==
=== Episode 9: Beat The House ===
Steve returns to Earth (chronologically after Episode 7) to find four years have passed and weakness is at an all-time high. He encounters a pair of medieval re-enactors upon landing, and beats them up when they ask that he join them as their leader. He then sets out to find his team: Rod is spying on gymnastics performers, Mephisto is guarding a blood bank (but some vampires have him in their pocket), Womp is being crushed by cars at a derby and Panda is in a zoo.

With his team reassembled, Steve tells his plan: to create the ultimate fist-worthy base to eradicate weakness, particularly that of the Medieval Re-enactors, from the face of the Earth. For this, they will need $1,000,000. He has a plan: the Fist Team's new target is gambling- not gambling itself, but the losers. He plans to beat the house in the most fistworthy way imaginable: steal it. For his plan, Rod will impersonate a famous hypnotist while Panda will be his 'lovely assistant'; Womp will pretend to be a famous professional gambler and provide a distraction while Mephisto will pretend to be a guard, allowing to sneak in a vampire friend (who will not show up on the security cameras).

It does not go as planned. Womp is caught up in his surprising success in gambling and does not fake a heart attack, prompting Steve to knock him out. Mephisto takes Womp down to the vault but Rod puts him to sleep due to a misunderstanding, and the vampire gets to Womp. They both then go on a rampage, causing security to lock everything down. Panda, meanwhile, has fallen in love with a mime. Rod and Mephisto barely escape, but Vampire Womp is disintegrated when he steps into the sunlight. Luckily, Steve managed to chain all the pokie machines to the prize car in the chaos and drives off with exactly $1,000,000. Due to stuffing up the least and not being disintegrated, Rod is given the new title 'Man of Fist'.

=== Episode 10: Council Smash ===
With the money acquired in the previous episode, the Fist Team (including Womp, who is both no longer a vampire and no longer dead) and the "competition winners," members of the public who joined the Fist Team through a competition but who are effectively kept by Steve as slave labour, set up in Prawn World, a dilapidated theme park in the bush with a giant prawn as its advertising mascot. Representatives of the council arrives to evict the Fist Team, and Steve immediately orders his team to take them down. A battle time is set for the following morning, when the council returns to evict them.

Rod is sent to the council offices, to take on the mayor (a humanoid mutant who is seen to devour a baby in a single mouthful) directly. However, in doing so he comes face-to-face with the mayor's secret weapon, Tara, a beautiful and deadly assassin who, when inactive, morphs into a vending machine controlled by special tokens. Mephisto remains at Prawn World and angers Steve with his convoluted plan involving the wearing of tin-foil hats, telling him to use more force.

The council arrives and the battle begins, and the council gains the upper hand. After disappointing Steve and being sent to a shed for time-out, a dejected Womp speaks with his subconscious, which instills in him the confidence he needs to reclaim his position in the fight (and causes him to grow antlers). Womp returns and helps to win the fight. Steve gives his brother Rod the 'Man of Fist' award, despite Rod being almost killed in an epic fight against Tara and contributing very little else to the battle.

=== Episode 11: Fist Furniture ===
Steve decides that comfort is the root of all weakness, so he designs a collection of fistworthy furniture (which offers pain rather than comfort) and sends the team out to destroy Steve's main competition, Vard'e furniture. Although he was not rewarded with Man of Fist in the previous episode, Steve recognises Womp's new-found confidence (and antlers) and allows him to lead the expedition. However, after orchestrating a loss in a non-contact capoeira fight at Vard'e headquarters, Womp loses his antlers and reverts to his original self. The team returns and battles valiantly, but Steve ultimately acquires Tara's jar of tokens and takes control of the assassin. She is sent into battle and saves the day, winning the Man of Fist award. Meanwhile, Panda's ongoing relationship with the mime from Episode 9 continues to anger Steve.

=== Episode 12: Double Dragon ===
Steve's fist furniture does not sell as well as Steve had hoped. Worse, the website is hacked, and is replaced with a weak website mocking Steve. Steve sends the Fist Team out to find out who has taken over the website. The team traces a physical computer cable through the streets and locates an Internet Cafe populated by medieval re-enactors, still angry about Steve's treatment of them in Episode 9. They inform the team that the website (manifested as an enormous, purple monster) has broken free and cannot be contained. The Fist Team begins to battle, but is quickly short of numbers: verbal abuse from Womp has rendered Tara useless, and Mephisto is accosted by medieval re-creationists who ask him to be their leader against Steve — Mephisto considers this, and, in an ostensible betrayal of Steve, agrees to the proposal and does not tell Steve. So it is left to Rod to defeat the website. He succeeds, but is attacked by a smaller tendril of the site, which takes a chunk of hair from the back of his head, leaving Rod shocked and lacking confidence. The team returns victorious to Prawn World.

Meanwhile, all manner of chaos has broken loose at Prawn World. Buyers are cancelling their orders of Fist Furniture, and Steve vents all of his frustration on the Mime, whose relationship with Panda and whose weak refusal to ever speak he has never approved of. Steve sets upon the Mime, physically attacking him while shouting "Speak! Speak!". The Mime, so committed to his act, tries to write Steve a note to communicate, but Steve angrily crumples it and devises a new plan. He leaves Panda a message, ostensibly from the Mime, to meet him in the field; he then sets up a bouquet of flowers booby-trapped with a shotgun, and forces the Mime to watch from afar, so that the only way to save Panda was to shout out. However, the plan backfires, and the Mime does not speak; Panda's head is blown off, the Mime hangs himself, and the viewer sees the partially crumpled note that the Mime tried to give Steve: "I am mute." A broken Steve is met by the returning Fist Team, and he gives Panda a posthumous 'Man of Fist'.

=== Episode 13: House Party Challenge ===
Steve, still shattered from Panda's death, wanders off into the bush. Rod immediately assumes control, and organises a house party. Rod is still reeling from the loss of his hair in the battle against the website, and he hopes to regain his confidence by donning a wig and picking up (and most likely date-raping) several girls at the party. He also harbours a grudge against Womp, whose poor effort in the fight against the website he partially blames for the loss of his hair, so he tells Womp that the house party is a challenge, and whoever picks up the fewest girls is kicked out of the Fist Team. At the party, Womp lets the competition winners go free, believing their leader that they will return. Mephisto encounters a couple of medieval re-enactors, furthering his relationship with them. Rod, meanwhile, performs reasonably well with the ladies before losing his wig, revealing his bloodied scalp and turning them off. He tries to rectify the situation by calling on Tara, telling her that her mission is to sleep with him; she initially refuses, however he destroys her tokens in an accident, which effectively kills her at the end of her mission, so she vengefully completes her mission as violently as possible, as Rod vainly attempts to apologise.

Meanwhile, Steve comes across a tribe of overweight men living in the bush. He immediately proclaims them to be weak, but they tell him that the strongest thing a man can do is cry in front of another man, and eventually win him over. The men have a celebratory feast to initiate their newest member, but when Steve realises that both the food and the skin he was to wear as an initiation ritual came from Panda, he goes blind with rage, killing the entire tribe. He returns to Prawn World with a renewed focus to take over the world and use his power to destroy weakness, and declares himself the 'Man of Fist'.

=== Episode 14: Ultimate Weapon ===
Steve makes the Double the Fist Team climb a mountain where he was trained as a child to collect the "Ultimate Weapon." However, he causes the others (not including Womp) to become frightened when he does not give them parachutes to jump out the plane. He and Rod end up in a struggle and Rod's flare goes off, and the plane crashes. Womp rushes to Steve's rescue to find him disoriented, and expecting him to be carried to the top of the mountain. Meanwhile, Mephisto (who landed safely) has gone to town and finds that all he must do is take a chairlift to get to the top. He goes up and finds that all he has to do to get into the Castle which contains the Ultimate Weapon is cross a bridge, which he finds is guarded by a highly skilled guard.

Rod arrives to find Steve and tries to steal his glasses. Steve is infuriated and disowns him, making Rod run off ashamed (and imagine he has discovered terrorists). And so, Womp and Steve end up in a swirling chasm which keeps the world moving. Steve urges Womp to give up or go on without him. Womp insults Steve until he miraculously recovers from his injuries and lack of fist-worthiness, and Steve rewards him with the 'Man of Fist' award. Meanwhile, during Mephisto's battle with the guard, a piece of the bridge is broken off and is lodged in the side of the swirling chasm, thus stopping Earth from rotating and nullifying gravity. This allows Womp and Steve to be lifted from the chasm, while Mephisto discovers that the monks have let the guard believe that dolphins (his favorite animal, despite the fact that he has never seen one) are extinct due to the ocean filling with sand. Showing him a picture of a dolphin he caught whilst fishing, Mephisto brings the guard onto the side of the fist.

The Fist Team enters the Castle and do battle with the monks (failing miserably) while Womp goes underground to find the Ultimate Weapon. He discovers it to be guarded by two twins guards (Shane Dundas of the Umbilical Brothers), one who always tells the truth, and one who always lies. After a lengthy conversation, Womp causes the truthful guard to lie and the untruthful guard to be truthful, which causes them to explode. Womp collects the Ultimate Weapon (a chainsaw known as the Timesaw) and Steve defeats the peaceful monks by majestically tossing a flower at the leader. They all flee the collapsing castle, except for Womp who is buried alive, but digs himself free. As the episode ends, Rod imagines himself releasing a new record and becoming a huge sensation as he freezes to death.

=== Episode 15: TimeSaw ===
The Fist Team now possesses the TimeSaw, which can be used to cut holes in the time continuum, allowing them to travel through time. The Fist team goes through time to test its capabilities. During this, Rod has the rest of his hair blown off in a fight with a Futuristic Defence Force and goes insane. After this, the team goes back in time to an hour before James Cook officially discovered Australia. The purpose here is that the team will stop the un-fist-worthy English from settling Australia, allowing the Fist Team to guide Australia to a fist-worthy future.

After a long preparation, in which Mephisto builds a highly advanced catapult (which Steve criticises for being based on something too old). They and some modern day aboriginals use all their weapons to attack Cook, whose ships are fitted with futuristic laser cannons. Steve sends Womp into the future with the TimeSaw to collect some future weapons for them to even up the fight. However, Womp, to his horror, finds that the future Australia is a living nightmare in which Steve rules with an iron fist and punishes weakness by death, and in which street crime abounds but is tolerated because it is fistworthy. Womp also comes to see that he has been killed and that his Man of Fist photograph from the previous episode is being used as the personification of weakness. He is pursued by Steve's Fist Patrol for "being a Womp impersonator", but is saved by rebels. The rebels give Womp a rifle, and instruct him to kill Steve before he can "defeat King James in the Great Battle".

Meanwhile, Rod, who is a whimpering, cloaked mess without his hair, has followed Womp into the future. He steals the TimeSaw from Womp to go back to when he lost his hair fighting the rogue website; however, by saving his hair, he creates a paradox, whereby saving his hair negates the future Rod returning to save his hair. Eventually, a limousine appears, and a mystical Rod informs the real Rod that his power came not from the hair on his head, but from his pubic hair. Rod then returns to the future, and he and Womp return to 1770.

Back in 1770, Steve steals Cook's flag and prevents Australia from being discovered, but Cook simply begins the creation of a new one from undergarments. Soon enough, Cook tires of Steve's predatory tactics, and challenges him to a face off (much to Steve's annoyance, he means Chess, albeit a futuristic 3D Chess with Cluedo weapons). Steve is beaten horribly in it, so resorts to violence again. Rod helps Steve gain the upper hand over the English, while Womp sets up his sniper rifle. In two minds about whether to help or protect Steve, Womp reluctantly takes aim at Steve, but averts his eyes and shoots Cook. Womp is awarded 'Man of Fist' for the second time in a row, and Steve finishes Cook by planting his own Fist-worthy flag in the ground (through his neck).

Mephisto, when using his catapult, was transported back to prehistoric times, and remains there at the end of the episode.

=== Episode 16: The Great Battle ===
Mephisto, having survived since prehistoric times without ageing, is released in the present to be crowned King James by the waiting medieval re-enactors, plus Ballistic Man (the guard from Ultimate Weapon) and some Imperial Stormtroopers. The rest of the team arrives in the Fist Mobile, and Steve smashes the TimeSaw with a lightsaber. Steve is infuriated at Mephisto's betrayal, and threatens to kill him right then and there, but is stopped when Mephisto suggests that he is too scared to fight his entire army.

Womp drugs Steve and attempts to smother him, but just can't do it. Meanwhile, Steve has a flashback: years ago, when Steve was just a boy forcing his younger brother Rod to do idiotic stunts, Rod came upon Steve's signature glasses in a sewer pipe. Steve quickly stole them, and claimed that he found them, and thus was taken in by the Mystical Monks, as seen in Ultimate Weapon. Rod arrives to discover Steve without his glasses and they correctly conclude that Womp stole them. Rod pursues Womp as he gives the glasses to Mephisto, giving him near God-like strength.

Steve is visited by the ghosts of Panda and the Mime, who tell him that they respect the fact that he killed them for what he believed in. To show their respect, they give Steve his own army, composed entirely of the many Fist Branches. Meanwhile, Rod is ecstatic to find Tara in vending machine form. He hotwires her and brings her back to life, resulting in him getting beaten up, then kissed. Tara realises that, by not relying upon tokens, Rod has given her freedom.

Mephisto instructs the re-enactors to use actual weapons and the titular Great Battle begins. Ballistic Man battles Rod and gains the upper hand, but Tara, realising that fighting is in her nature, returns to assist. After Mephisto severely beats Steve, he plans on crushing him with a massive prawn statue. For a brief moment, the statue appears as a Dolphin, and having filled his greatest desire, Ballistic Man disintegrates, however he has delivered the finishing blow to Tara. Rod laments, then accidentally presses the sidekick button on the vending machine and sets her free in the form of a loveable little girl, who is almost immediately killed while skipping through the battlefield (though like all deaths on the show, whether she is actually dead is unlikely).

It is then that Mephisto's plan is revealed: acting loyally upon Steve's orders from the very beginning of the series, he remained committed to killing the medieval re-enactors; however, his plan was to do so by becoming their king, killing Steve to gain their trust, then after four years, poisoning them all on an island. Womp protests Steve's death, but is bullied into standing aside. Womp then sees Steve appear to say "I love you" and whacks Mephisto in the back and sends the glasses flying onto Steve's face. Mephisto is defeated and the Fist Team is victorious. Steve awards Rod the Full Fist for offering to kill all the re-enactors by himself when Steve's glasses were stolen, and Mephisto gains the Double Fist and the 'Man of Fist' for his amazing (if misguided) efforts and loyalty. Womp, however is shot in the head for being weak and being pushed around. The dystopian future is set exactly as Womp viewed it in the previous episode, and Steve, Rod and Mephisto fly into the sky.
