= Martin Cohen (philosopher) =

British philosopher, an editor and reviewer (born 1964)

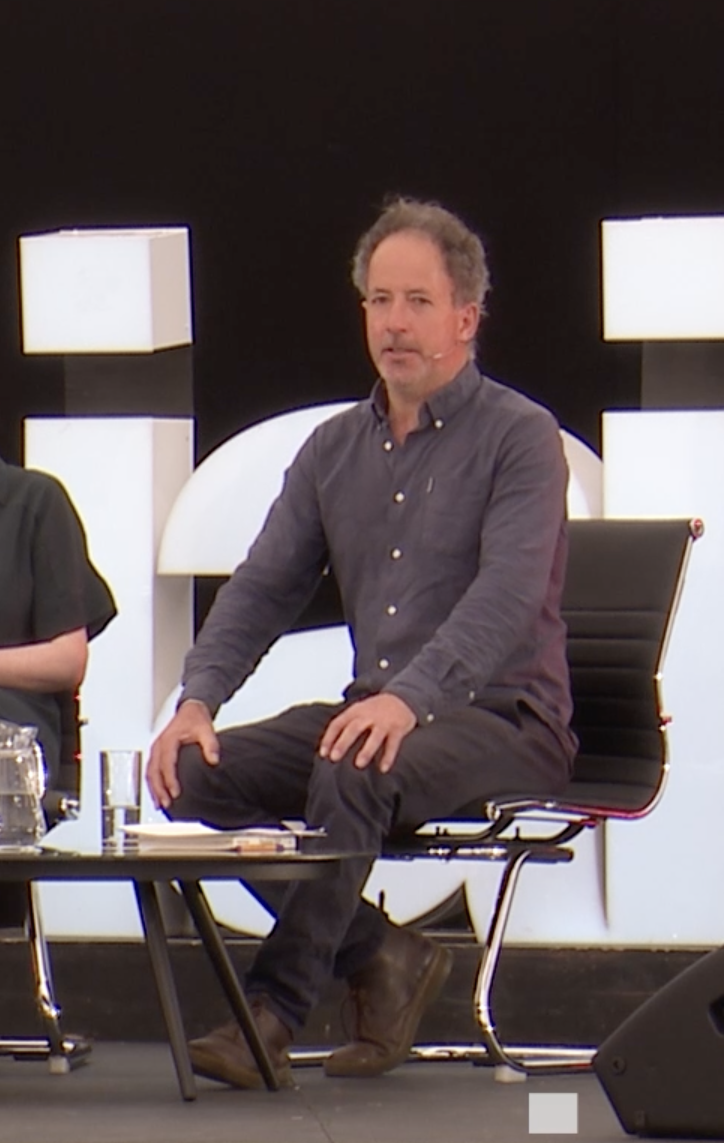
- Martin Cohen talking at HowTheLightGetsIn 2023
- Born: 1964 (age 61–62); Brighton, East Sussex, England
- Education: Sussex University (BA); University of Exeter (PhD)
- Occupations: Philosopher, writer
- Website: www.martincohenauthor.com

Martin Cohen (born 1964) is a British philosopher, an editor and reviewer who writes on philosophy, philosophy of science, and political philosophy.

== Biography ==
He studied philosophy and social science at Sussex University where his tutors included some of the early group of philosophers who launched the university's pioneering language and values programme, including Terry Diffey and Bernard Harrison. He obtained a teaching qualification at Keele University and his PhD in philosophy of education from the University of Exeter. After research posts at universities in Britain and Australia, Cohen moved to France to concentrate on his writing, which typically blend "psychological and social studies with philosophical theory ... eschewing technical jargon and using easily understood scenarios to demonstrate the theme". The first of these, 101 Philosophy Problems has been published in a dozen languages and is now in its third edition. His book on thought experiments, Wittgenstein's Beetle and Other Classic Thought Experiments was selected by The Guardian as one of its 'books of the week' and the Times Literary Supplement said that 'With its sense of history, Wittgenstein's Beetle provides the opportunity to consider which thought experiments last.'

Another element of Martin Cohen's style in presenting philosophy is to use simple and unpretentious line drawings both to break up the text (and make it less monolithic) and to illustrate specific issues under discussion, for example the 'Traditional Chinese Problem' of the turtle told to cross a pan of boiling water by balancing on a piece of bamboo.

Cohen has been a frequent contributor and reviewer for the Times Higher Education Supplement (THES), the New Statesman (on environmental issues) and the Guardian (London) (on the role of computers in education) as well as occasional pieces on economics including the obesity issue. His writing, for example, on food and society, blends philosophy and social science as well as ethics.

Martin Cohen is also the editor-in-chief of the Philosopher since 1995.

An article in the New York Times (entitled Nuclear Power's Death Somewhat Exaggerated) quoted his book on energy policy and ethics to illustrate how business interests can join forces with environmentalists to improve their public image, a point he also explored in an article for the Times Higher (London) entitled 'The Profits of Doom'.

Mind Games was selected by France Culture as one of new philosophy books for dissection in the program essai du jour; Paradigm Shift: How Expert Opinions Keep Changing on Life, the Universe and Everything was featured on RTE Radio 1 in Ireland;The Sun described The Ah-Ha Moment as being the ultimate "feel good" book.

== Philosophical work ==
=== Paradigm Shift ===
Paradigm Shift: How Expert Opinions Keep Changing on Life, the Universe and Everything (Imprint Academic UK September 2015) is a book by Cohen. It claims that scientific knowledge is less certain than it is usually portrayed. Cohen offers a number of examples to back up this claim, which he traces back to Thomas Kuhn, and the original theory of 'paradigm shifts' in 1962, in his book The Structure of Scientific Revolutions.

In this key social science text, Kuhn claims that the progress of scientific knowledge is not the steady accumulation of pieces of a great jigsaw but rather a haphazard, political affair involving periodic paradigm shifts in which much of the old certainties are abandoned in order to open up new approaches to understanding that scientists would never have considered valid before.

The idea behind Cohen's book is to treat a broader sweep of issues than Kuhn does, from public health to climate change and high finance, as a series of 'case studies' which he argues illustrate both the radical insights Kuhn's theory brings, and conversely the error of assuming that science and knowledge generally is 'a very sensible and reassuringly solid sort of affair'. He advocates the 'separation of state and science'.

Cohen argues information cascades can distort rational, scientific debate, with a particular focus on health issues. The book looks at the example of highly mediatised 'pandemic' alarms, and why they have turned out eventually to be little more than scares.

=== Cow in the Field Thought Experiment ===
Martin Cohen is well known for having invented the famous 'cow-in-the-field' thought experiment in the spirit of Edmond Gettier's imaginary scenarios intended to explore the nature of knowledge. The Cow in the Field leads his book 101 Philosophy Problems including being on the cover of the second edition. However, numerous websites erroneously attribute the imaginary scenario directly to Gettier.

== Select bibliography ==
- 101 Philosophy Problems (1999, 2001, 2007 2013)
- Adam Smith: The Wealth of Nations (2000)
- Political Philosophy from Plato to Mao (2001, 2008)
- 101 Ethical Dilemmas (2002, 2007)
- Wittgenstein's Beetle and Other Classic Thought Experiments (2004)
- No Holiday: 80 places you DON'T want to visit (2005)
- The Essentials of Philosophy and Ethics (2006)
- Philosophical Tales (2008)
- Philosophy For Dummies, UK edition (2010)
- Mind Games: 31 Days to Rediscover Your Mind (2010)
- The Doomsday Machine: The High Price of Nuclear Energy, The World's Most Dangerous Fuel (pub. 2012, co-authored with Andrew McKillop)
- How to Live: Wise (and not-so-wise) Advice from the Philosophers on Everyday Life (2014)
- Critical Thinking Skills for Dummies (2015)
- Paradigm Shift: How Expert Opinions Keep Changing on Life, the Universe and Everything (2015)
- Cracking Philosophy (2016). Also published under the title The Philosophy Bible
- Philosophy Hacks (2017)
- I Think Therefore I Eat (2018)
- The Leader's Bookshelf (2020)
- Rethinking Thinking: Problem Solving from Sun Tzu to Google (2022)
- The Ah-Ha Moment (2024)
- Liberalism, Human Values and Schools as Microcosms of Society: Rediscovering Education for a Moral Future (2025)

== See also ==
- Technological paradigm
