= Olúfẹ́mi O. Táíwò =

American philosopher and political theorist

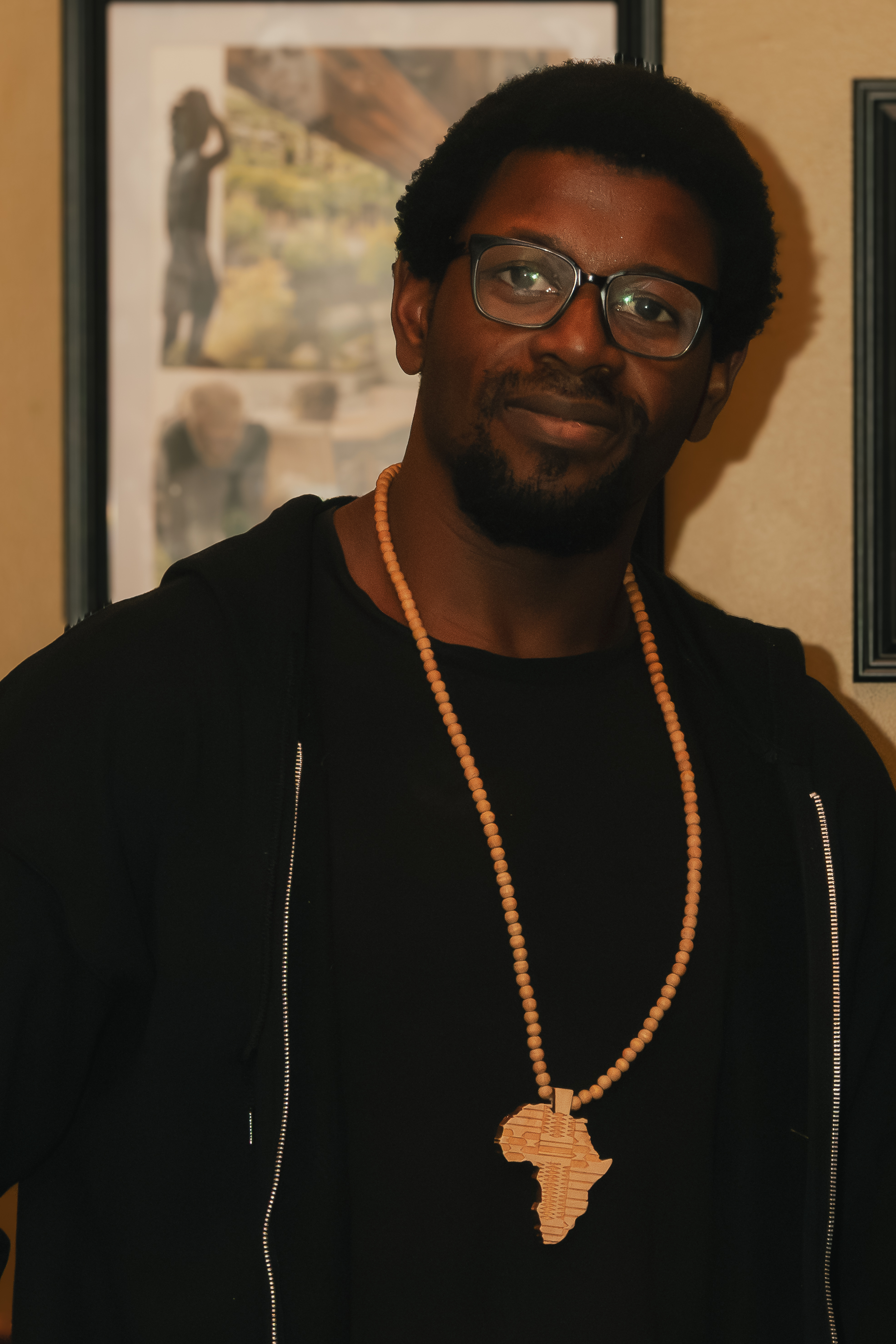
- Born: 1990 (age 35–36)

Academic background
- Education: Indiana University Bloomington (BA); University of California, Los Angeles (MA, PhD)

Academic work
- Institutions: Georgetown University

Olúfẹ́mi O. Táíwò ([o.lú.fɛ́.mi tá.í.wò]; born 1990) is an American philosopher and professor at Georgetown University. He is the author of two books: Reconsidering Reparations and Elite Capture. Grist described him as "one of America’s most prominent philosophers" and "the most vocal philosopher working on issues related to climate change." Táíwò regularly contributes articles to publications such as The New Yorker, The Guardian, and Foreign Policy, in addition to academic journals.

== Early life and education ==
Born in 1990, Táíwò lived in the San Francisco Bay Area for the first year of his life, before moving with his family to Cincinnati, Ohio, where there was a large Nigerian community. His parents both immigrated from Nigeria in the early 1980s to attend graduate school in the United States. His mother worked in pharmacology at Procter & Gamble, while his father was an engineer who stayed at home to take care of his brother, who is autistic.

Táíwò earned his Bachelor of Arts in philosophy from Indiana University Bloomington and his PhD in philosophy from the University of California, Los Angeles.

== Career ==
Táíwò first gained widespread notice with a 2020 essay in The Philosopher on the "limitations of 'epistemic deference'." In the essay, he argued that amplifying certain voices on the basis of group membership in a marginalized community does not necessarily solve fundamental problems and could impede formation of authentic relationships. His book Elite Capture: How the Powerful Took Over Identity Politics and Everything Else builds on this piece, as well as a related essay which appeared in Boston Review.

His theoretical work is heavily influenced by the Black radical tradition, contemporary philosophy of language, materialist thought, social science, German transcendental philosophy, activist histories, and activist thinkers. His second book Elite Capture examines how elites have co-opted radical critiques of racial capitalism to further their own agendas.

== Critical reception ==
In a review for Race & Class, Franklin Obeng-Odoom called Reconsidering Reparations "brilliant" and "powerful" despite "some serious faux pas."

Writing in the journal Mind, Megan Blomfeld positions Táíwò as an "accessible writer and skilled storyteller" for a general audience, but notes that Táíwò does not include enough of a review of the philosophical literature on reparations to dissuade proponents of other views.

== Books ==
- Táíwò, Olúfẹ́mi O. (2022). Reconsidering Reparations. Oxford University Press. ISBN 978-0-19-750891-6.
- Táíwò, Olúfẹ́mi O. (2022). Elite Capture: How the Powerful Took Over Identity Politics (and Everything Else). Haymarket Books. ISBN 978-1-64259-735-6.
