= 101 Philosophy Problems =

1999 book by Martin Cohen

- Author: Martin Cohen
- Language: English
- Subject: Philosophy
- Genre: popular philosophy
- Published: 1999 (Routledge Taylor Francis)
- Publication place: UK
- Media type: Paperback, hardback, electronic
- Pages: 238 (third edition, 2007)
- ISBN: 978-0-415-40402-0
- OCLC: 75713360
- Dewey Decimal: 100 22
- LC Class: BD21 .C635 2007

101 Philosophy Problems (1999) is a philosophy book for a general audiences by Martin Cohen published by Routledge.

== Format and summary ==
The format of the book was unique and later copied by other authors. For example, in Julian Baggini's The Pig That Wants to Be Eaten it was observed that the books "format is essentially the same as that first successfully introduced by Martin Cohen's 101 Philosophy Problems."

In a review for the Times Higher Education Supplement (London), Harry Gensler, Professor of philosophy, at John Carroll University, Cleveland, describes the book:

"The book has 101 humorous little stories, each with a philosophical problem (not however, necessarily, the usual Unsolved problems in philosophy). For example, problem 54 is about Mr Megasoft, who dies leaving his fortune to his favourite computer. Megasoft's children take the matter to court, contending that the computer cannot think and so cannot inherit money. Mr Megasoft's lawyers claim that the computer can think. But on what grounds can we say that computers can or cannot think?"

Other stories deal with paradoxes, ethics, aesthetics, perception, time, God, physics, and knowledge and include problems from Zeno, Descartes, Russell, Nelson Goodman, Edmund Gettier and others. The problems are followed by a discussion section and a glossary.

== Reception ==
In a review for The Philosopher, Dr. Zenon Stavrinides says that:

"Both in regard to its structure and the style in which it is written, it is very unconventional. The first part of the book consists of a series of very short stories or narrative texts, grouped by subject-matter, setting out problems or puzzles of philosophical interest. Some of these problems are well-known in philosophical literature, e.g. the paradox of Epimenides the Cretan, who said: 'All Cretans are liars'. In the second part of the book, entitled 'Discussions', Cohen provides explanations and analyses of the issues raised by each of the problems, with some references to the treatment offered by particular historical philosophers. These discussions are intelligent and balanced, if (in most cases at least) inevitably inconclusive."

101 Philosophy Problems has been reviewed in The Philosophers Magazine by Julian Baggini (Summer 1999); the Ilkley Gazette (May 29, 1999 ); The Guardian (5.11.1999); and Der Spiegel (2001).

== Editions ==
It has had three English editions and been translated into German, Dutch, Greek, Estonian, Korean, Chinese, Spanish, Portuguese, Japanese and other languages. The German translation has alone run to three editions, one by Campus and two by Piper, including a massmarket hardback edition. There also an edition in Persian.
