= The Upside Down Show =

Children's television series

- Genre: Comedy; Preschool; Surreal comedy; Slapstick
- Created by: Belinda Ward; David Collins; Shane Dundas
- Directed by: Peter Cudlipp; Julie Money
- Starring: David Collins; Shane Dundas; Amanda Bishop
- Voices of: Emma de Vries; Virginia Goodfellow; Mat McCoy; Alice Osborne; Adam Smillie
- Composer: David Chapman
- Countries of origin: Australia; United States
- Original language: English
- No. of episodes: 13

Production
- Executive producers: Michael Bourchier; Kurt Mueller
- Producer: Wendy Gray
- Cinematography: Ian Jones
- Editor: Simon Martin
- Camera setup: Both single-camera and multi-camera
- Running time: 24 minutes
- Production companies: Blink Films; Sesame Workshop

Original release
- Network: Nickelodeon (Australia); Noggin (United States)
- Release: October 13 – November 13, 2006

The Upside Down Show is a children's television series produced by Blink Films and Sesame Workshop. It was made for Noggin, a channel co-founded by Sesame Workshop. The series is set in a strange apartment building where the doors lead to a variety of unusual rooms. It is presented by brothers David and Shane (played by the Umbilical Brothers), who live in the apartment building with their sidekick Puppet, their neighbor Mrs. Foil, and a group of fuzzy creatures called the Schmuzzies. In each episode, David gives the viewers an imaginary remote control that affects the characters and their surroundings.

The series was inspired by the Umbilical Brothers' adult-oriented comedy act SpeedMouse, which was also based on the idea of an imaginary remote. Producers from Sesame Workshop saw SpeedMouse and ordered a pilot episode based on it, which became The Upside Down Show. The pilot was successful, and in 2005, Noggin ordered a season of 13 episodes. The show was written and produced in New York, and it was filmed in Sydney, Australia. The cast and crew featured a mix of Australian and American talent. While creating the series, the writers intentionally included jokes for adults as well as children; Shane Dundas likened The Upside Down Show to making "an adult show for kids."

In 2010, the Umbilical Brothers announced that they had completed a script for a special-length episode titled The Upside Down Movie, which would act as a proper finale for the series. The movie had been in development since 2008. Nickelodeon Australia provided funding for the movie's scriptwriting, but the project needed support from outside investors to start filming, which never occurred. As recently as March 2017, the Umbilical Brothers have stated that they are still interested in making the movie and are trying to find support for it.

== History ==
=== Origins ===
The show's concept is based on SpeedMouse, a live comedy act that the Umbilical Brothers performed for adult audiences in the 1990s. The plot involved an invisible remote control that dictated the Brothers' actions on stage. Shane Dundas called the remote "a handy idea that we took directly from SpeedMouse and it all grew into a whole another animal." Producers from Sesame Workshop enjoyed the remote control in SpeedMouse and felt that the physical comedy would lend itself to a family-oriented television show. Sesame Workshop approached the Umbilical Brothers with plans to develop a series, and the Brothers accepted. The Upside Down Show was the Brothers' second venture into family television, after Umbilical TV, a set of short films that the Brothers made in the 1990s.

=== Production ===
In developing the series, the creators set out to make an "adult show for kids"—adapting the adult-oriented SpeedMouse for a wider audience while also adding layered jokes for parents and older viewers. According to Shane Dundas: "with The Upside Down Show the mantra was 'Well, kids are going to love this but we really want to make sure there are gags in there for the grown-ups as well!'" David Collins elaborated, "The series is filled with gags that will fly over the heads of little ones and straight into the face of the parent stalking behind them. Some of these gags we had to fight [the censors] for." In an interview with The Age, he said, "Basically we'd try to get away with as much as we could. Sometimes the cameras stopped rolling because there were a few moments that were too risque for kids."

A half-hour pilot episode was made from December 2004 to March 2005. The pilot never aired on television, but it was screened at MIPTV Media Market in April 2005. The pilot followed David and Shane searching for the beach, and this storyline was later reworked into an episode of the main show. For the pilot, the show's art department glued the entire living room set to the ceiling to give the look of an "upside down" room; in the final series, the camera is simply turned around at various points to create the upside-down illusion. The character of Puppet had a different design, and he was named "Stretch" in the pilot. David and Shane also wore different costumes: simple T-shirts with swirl designs on them.

The pilot was successful, and Noggin ordered a full season of 13 episodes in 2005. They aired in fall 2006. On December 27, 2006, in an interview with the New York Post, Shane Dundas said he was unsure if the series would be renewed for a second season, and that Noggin would make a final decision in February 2007 about renewing it. On June 1, 2007, the Umbilical Brothers wrote on their website that Noggin decided not to order a second season.

=== Broadcast ===
In the United States, the series was first shown on the main Nickelodeon channel as a "sneak peek" on October 13, 2006. After this, the show was seen exclusively on Noggin, which aired every episode over a month-long period from October 16, to November 13, 2006. Noggin aired the episodes slightly out of order; it showed "Art Museum" and "Farm" (episodes 3 and 11 respectively) as the premiere episodes, then aired the remainder of the show in its original production order. In Australia, Nickelodeon premiered the episodes on a more sporadic schedule; the series debuted on August 25, 2006, and did not air the last episode until February 2007. Reruns would continue to air until March 1, 2012.

The Upside Down Show also aired on four international channels: Nick Jr. UK, Nickelodeon Asia, TVOKids in Canada, and Boomerang in Latin America. Nick Jr. UK ran the first episode on April 10, 2006, with reruns continuing until January 2007. Nickelodeon Asia premiered the show on August 9, 2006, and it continued to play reruns until 2010. TVOKids aired the show from September 2006 until 2008. Boomerang aired the show from September 1, 2007, until late 2007.

=== Unfinished finale movie ===
In August 2008, the newspaper The Australian announced that the Umbilical Brothers were making a movie adaptation of the show. The Umbilical Brothers also announced this on their Facebook page, writing that "there is a script in development for a movie version of The Upside Down Show." A month later, the newspaper The Sydney Morning Herald published an interview with Shane Dundas and David Collins, in which they revealed that the project would be titled The Upside Down Movie and that it was planned to start filming within the next year. In January 2010, David Collins announced that the script had been finished, and that the project would act as a proper series finale. Collins also confirmed that Nickelodeon Australia was "hugely supportive of trying to get the film made and have been partially funding the script development." The Umbilical Brothers started an online petition to demonstrate public support of the movie, but the project did not receive enough support from outside investors to start filming. In March 2017, Collins stated that he was still trying to find support for the movie.

== Characters ==
From left to right: David, the Schmuzzies (three are shown throughout the photo), Puppet, Shane, and Mrs. Foil.

- Shane (played by Shane Dundas) is David's younger brother, who is more frenetic, impulsive, and hyperactive than David, but he is also a quicker thinker and comes up with many interesting ideas. Shane tends to get annoyed by the unpredictable nature of the Remote, since it often interrupts his daily activities.
- David (played by David Collins) is the older of the two brothers who has super-sensitive hearing and a super-sensitive sense of smell. He is more laid-back and straight-laced than Shane but still tends to get distracted by small things. He loves the Schmuzzies and acts as their good friend, translator, and mentor.
- Mrs. Foil (played by Amanda Bishop) is the brothers' friendly, off-beat neighbor who lives in a different apartment. She is blonde and plays the tuba, which she brings with her even when swimming and camping. She tends to appear in odd places at odd times, including many of the "Wrong Turn" rooms, where she is often dressed up in different costumes.
- Puppet (performed and voiced by Mat McCoy) is the brothers' sidekick, roommate, and best friend. He dreams of becoming an actor and film director, and he can often be found practicing monologues or writing screenplays. He is interested in Shakespeare and likes to play unconventional roles. He is generally more rational than David and Shane, but is often just as silly as the boys. He speaks with an American accent.
- The Schmuzzies (performed and voiced by Emma de Vries, Virginia Goodfellow and Alice Osborne) are a group of small, fuzzy, dustball-like creatures who live throughout the apartment. They come in a wide range of bright colors and speak a language called Schmuzzish, which is made up of rhyming sounds and modified English words ("Schmello, Schmuzzies!"). Shane is afraid of them and sees them as pests, while David is good friends with them and is fluent in their language.
- The Voice (voiced by Adam Smillie) is the unseen, all-knowing narrator of the series, who often reminds David and Shane to knock on doors before entering.
- The Action Fingers (performed and voiced by David Collins and Shane Dundas respectively) are the superhero alter egos of Shane and David's hands, who arrive to fix any problems they are called for.
- Fido (vocal effects by Shane Dundas) is Shane's invisible pet fly, who communicates through buzzing noises that Shane translates.

== Episode structure ==
Each episode begins with a cold open showing one or both brothers in the middle of an activity. David introduces "the Remote" by pretending to hold a remote control. He explains that the Remote can control the action on-screen. He demonstrates by pressing various buttons, which control Shane's actions. The Remote also has "wild card" buttons that cause strange or undesired effects. The main one is the "Upside Down" button, which causes the camera to shift to an upside down shot and can only be undone with the "Right Side Up" button. After explaining it, David gives the Remote to the viewer. The brothers ask the viewer to "press the Play button" to start the episode. Before the episode starts, the viewer commonly presses the wrong button and puts the brothers in a bizarre situation. As soon as the play button is pressed, the theme song begins. This sequence features the Action Fingers jumping over the show's title and credits, and it ends with them opening the apartment door.

The rest of the story always starts in David and Shane's living room. Every episode features their sidekick Puppet and the Schmuzzies, who live with the brothers in their apartment. The goal of each story is for David and Shane to get to a certain location. The brothers spend the episode searching for the location through the various doors, windows, and other places in their apartment. The brothers occasionally request help from the viewers, asking them to press buttons on their remote. Their journey takes them to three "Wrong Turn" rooms, and in one of these rooms, they often encounter another puppet (or in the case of the episode "Movies", two), who help them get back on track, mostly stating information about their desired location, or object, as seen in the episode "Mini Golf". The brothers' neighbor Mrs. Foil appears in the different rooms in various costumes, either helping them on their quest or unintentionally causing more trouble.

At one point on their journey, the brothers always encounter a child who teaches them something and sets them on the correct path. Eventually, they locate their destination "for the very first time" and visit the place in fast motion. The show ends with David and Shane back in their apartment. During the last few minutes of the show, they give the viewer an imaginary souvenir to thank them for their help throughout the episode. During the last moment of the show, they play around in their apartment while the end credits roll.

== Episodes ==
=== Series overview ===
Season	Episodes	Originally released	
Season	Episodes	First released	Last released
1	13	October 13, 2006	November 13, 2006

No.	Title	Directed by	Written by	Original release date	Prod. code
Pilot	"Pilot"	TBD	TBD	April 2005 (MIPTV screening) Unaired (TV)	None
An unaired pilot episode of the show started production in December 2004. It was screened at MIPTV Media Market in April 2005. The pilot episode followed David and Shane searching for the beach, with early versions of the Schmuzzies, Mrs. Foil, and Puppet (who was named "Stretch" at the time). The storyline of the pilot was eventually rewritten and adapted for the episode "Beach," but no footage from the pilot was used.
1	"Movie Theater"	Julie Money	Joey Mazzarino	October 18, 2006 (Note: Some international channels aired the "Movie Theater" episode before the official American premiere. Nick Jr. UK was the first, airing it on April 10, 2006.)	101
Puppet directs a movie starring David and Shane as spacemen, pirates, and cowboys. While Puppet prepares for the movie's premiere, David and Shane try to find the movie theater. First, they find Mrs. Foil's laundry room, where they mistake spinning laundry for their film. There, the Action Fingers help two socks reunite with each other. Next, David and Shane find a dance studio, where they see themselves in a mirror, believing that it is their film. On their way to another room, the brothers are stopped by the Schmuzzies, who play a rhyming game with them before letting them to the next room. The room turns out to be a white void with a single chair, which they mistake for a theater seat. In the end, the brothers discover a door with their faces on it. It turns out to be a photograph of them, revealing the theater where they watch their movie which is a big success.
2	"Barbershop"	Julie Money	Judy Freudberg	October 20, 2006	102
After visiting the Very Hairy Room, Shane grows a head full of hair and is afraid to get a haircut. David and Puppet give Shane an imaginary haircut, but he needs a real one at a barbershop. They look for one and find the Very Very Hairy Room, which just makes Shane's hair longer. Next, they find hairbrushes growing like plants in the Hairbrush Room and being used as microphones in the Concert Room, but they do not find anything to cut hair with. Shane's hair grows so long that the Schmuzzies move into it, which makes him rush to find the barbershop. He does, and Mrs. Foil acts as the barber, bringing Shane back to his old bald self.
3	"Art Museum"	Julie Money	Billy Aronson	October 16, 2006	103
Shane creates an artistic masterpiece and tries to hang it on a door, but Puppet keeps opening it to practice dramatic entrances. Shane tries to put his art on the fridge and even on Mrs. Foil, but he and David decide that it belongs in an art museum instead. They search for it and find the Sticky Room, where everything gets stuck to each other; the Fog Room, where it is too foggy to see Shane's painting; and the Museum of Finger Painting, where a boy shows the brothers how to finger paint. David and Shane eventually open the door to their stuff closet, which leads them to a real art museum. There, Mrs. Foil leads a tour group of Schmuzzies to see Shane's artwork.
4	"Pet Shop"	Peter Cudlipp	Tony Geiss	October 23, 2006	104
David is jealous of Shane's pet fly, Fido, and decides that he wants a pet of his own. Puppet volunteers to play the role of his pet, but David states that he thinks of Puppet more as a friend. David and Shane search for a pet shop in the Puppy Room, but there are no puppies to adopt. They later ask a parrot for directions in the Parrot Room, but the parrot just repeats whatever they say. The Schmuzzies make some rhyming suggestions about which pet David should get (all ending with "-oon"), which ends up opening a door to the Moon. In the end, David finds a pet shop run by Mrs. Foil, and he decides to take Mrs. Foil's chair home as his new pet: Spot the Chair.
5	"Camping"	Peter Cudlipp	P. Kevin Strader	October 25, 2006	105
After reading a bedtime story to the Schmuzzies and singing a lullaby for Puppet, David and Shane try to go to bed. They discover that their bedrooms have been replaced with a marching band and a stampede of elephants, so they set out to find somewhere else to sleep. First, David and Shane find the Snoring Room, where loud snoring keeps them from sleeping. Next, they find beds in the Wake Up Room, but everything in the room is designed to wake them up. Finally, they enter the Shape Room and mistake two shapes for beds, until a girl in a wheelchair explains what the shapes are. In the end, they find Mrs. Foil's campsite, where they sleep in sleeping bags.
6	"Picnic"	Peter Cudlipp	Luis Santeiro	October 27, 2006	106
Puppet and the brothers take Shane's pet fly, Fido, on his first-ever picnic. The brothers search for a spot to have their picnic and find three places: the Sandwich Room, where they get their picnic food; the No-Room Room, where it is too cramped for a picnic; and the Wind Room, where gusts of wind prevent them from setting up the picnic. David and Shane give up, thinking that they will never have a picnic for Fido. Shane tries to cheer Fido up with a ditty (later joined by a reluctant David, Puppet, and the Schmuzzies), but nothing works until Fido's family comes over and leads the group to a perfect picnic spot outside. There, they play picnic games with Mrs. Foil and throw Puppet around like a ball.
7	"Airport"	Julie Money	Joey Mazzarino	October 30, 2006	107
The Schmuzzies tell Puppet that his cousin, Mary Annette, is coming to visit and is waiting at the airport. Puppet needs to rehearse his family's traditional welcome song, so David and Shane offer to pick Mary Annette up. They search for the airport and end up in the Bird Room, which makes them act like birds. They fly away into the Paper Airplane Room, where the Action Fingers help refold Mrs. Foil's paper airplane. Third, David and Shane jump into a dictionary and find a room filled with words, where a girl teaches them "plane" in sign language. After the brothers take part in Puppet's welcome song, Puppet suggests climbing the ceiling to find the airport, which works and brings Mary Annette to the apartment.
8	"Beach"	Julie Money	Judy Freudberg	November 1, 2006	108
When David and Shane lose their beach ball, Puppet suggests looking for it at the beach. David and Shane find three rooms with beach-like qualities, but none of them are the beach. The Underwater Room has water but no sand, the Desert Room has sand but no water, and the South Pole is too cold to be a beach. The Schmuzzies try to tell the brothers that they have seen the "schmeach schmall," but by the time David translates for the Schmuzzies, the beach ball is gone. Eventually, David and Shane find a door with water and sand coming out from under it, which leads them to the beach. They reunite with their beach ball, play around in the sand, and accidentally ruin Mrs. Foil's sand castle. Luckily, the Action Fingers rebuild it, and the brothers leave the beach after giving their beach ball to Mrs. Foil as a gift.
9	"Marching Band"	Julie Money	Billy Aronson	November 6, 2006	109
David and Shane invent their own imaginary instruments and want to join the local marching band. Puppet wants to join as well: at first, he tries to be a bandleader and leads the Schmuzzies around the apartment, but he later decides he would rather be the bandleader's baton instead. David and Shane find the Funny Music Room, where every object makes a melody, and the Marching Room, where four kids show the brothers how to march. They even find the Sky Room, where they join a singing bird's band, but there is nowhere to march. Eventually, David and Shane follow the sound of an orchestra and find the marching band, where Puppet is the baton and Mrs. Foil plays her tuba full of Schmuzzies.
10	"Birthday Party"	Julie Money	P. Kevin Strader	November 8, 2006	110
The Schmuzzies are throwing a "Schmirthday Schmarty" and invite Puppet and Mrs. Foil. Puppet gives invitations to David, Shane, and the viewers as well. With no directions on their invitations, the brothers try to figure out where the party is being held. They search in the No-Fun Room, where Mrs. Foil tells them no celebrations are allowed. They look in the Surprise Room, where there are surprises behind every door but no parties. David and Shane follow a "Happy Birthday" singer to the Opera Room, but it turns out that it is just an opera about a birthday. The brothers return to their apartment, only to discover that the party is for them.
11	"Farm"	Peter Cudlipp	Joey Mazzarino	October 13, 2006 (Nickelodeon) October 16, 2006 (Noggin)	111
The apartment residents have a band called the Talking Airheads, which features Shane on guitar; David on drums and a cowbell; the Schmuzzies on the marimba; Fido the Fly on trumpet; and Puppet as the songwriter. The band faces a setback when David's cowbell, attached to an imaginary cow named Clarabelle, disappears. David and Shane try to find the cowbell in the Great Big Bell Room, where Mrs. Foil has a giant bell but no cowbells. They fish for the cowbell in a boat out at sea, where they help Mrs. Foil go "tuba diving" with her tuba, and go for a ride in the Bicycle Room. All the while, Puppet tries to bring Clarabelle to the apartment by playing farm songs, which inspires David and Shane to look for her at Mrs. Foil's farm. They find Clarabelle and bring her back for their big musical performance.
12	"Ice Cream Truck"	Peter Cudlipp	Billy Aronson	November 10, 2006	112
Puppet teaches David and Shane about ice cream. The brothers decide that they must try some, so they search for the ice cream truck. They find the Frozen Room, where an ice-skating Mrs. Foil has ice cream of her own, and the "This Way" Room, where the ice cream truck is on the wrong side and cannot be reached. They stumble into an ice cream game show hosted by Mrs. Foil, but the brothers lose the game after failing to scoop ice cream the right way. Back at the apartment, the Schmuzzies have gotten entire tubs of ice cream for themselves, and they show David and Shane where Mrs. Foil's ice cream truck is. The brothers have trouble waiting their turn, but they finally get some ice cream from Mrs. Foil.
13	"Mini Golf"	Peter Cudlipp	Joey Mazzarino and John Weidman	November 13, 2006	113
David and Shane are baffled when a mysterious orange sphere (a mini golf ball) appears in their living room. At first, they think it is a planet and journey to outer space to return it. An alien explains that planets are much bigger, and the brothers fall back to Earth, accidentally dropping the ball with a pair of playful Schmuzzies. Next, the brothers think the orange thing is an orange fruit, but Mrs. Foil explains how real oranges are very different. David and Shane decide it must be a ball and try to play with it on a basketball court, but it does not bounce. Puppet uses the thing as "Yorick" for a Shakespearean monologue and tells the brothers what it actually is, prompting them to visit the mini golf course, where they play golf with Mrs. Foil.

== Home media ==
Despite only having 13 episodes, the series has had a total of eight separate DVD releases. In Australia, the show's episodes were released across six DVD volumes, each containing 2-3 episodes. Each DVD disc was made to look like one of the Schmuzzies. In June 2009, the Umbilical Brothers temporarily sold an exclusive "Complete Series" DVD collection on their website, which combined the previous six volumes onto a two-disc DVD set. The collection was a limited edition, and it was discontinued after it went out of stock. On January 19, 2012, an American DVD featuring all 13 episodes was released as an Amazon exclusive.

Since 2018, the Umbilical Brothers originally uploaded the entire series to their public YouTube channel, making every episode available to view for free. In the descriptions of several uploads, David Collins included behind-the-scenes trivia about the episodes. They were temporarily privated in July 2026 due to licensing issues with Sesame Workshop. They were later unprivated in September of the same year. The series was available on the Noggin mobile app from 2015 to 2020, and it was added to Paramount+ in 2021. The show was removed from Paramount+ in December 2024.

== Reception ==
=== Critical reception ===
The series was critically acclaimed for its humor and broad appeal. Larisa Wiseman of Common Sense Media gave the series a 5-star review, calling it "refreshingly original; each episode is filled with clever jokes, puns, music, and tons of physical humor." The Hollywood Reporter called the show "outrageously funny and inventive" and "imaginative to the core," saying that David and Shane "will have young viewers mesmerized. Older viewers also will find a trove of silly antics that are easy to watch and joyful to ponder." Robert Lloyd of the Los Angeles Times wrote that "The Upside Down Show is not only good, but good for you ... But what matters most is that it is delightful ... I noticed, as I watched the show for the first time, that I was sitting cross-legged on the floor about a foot from the TV screen, absolutely entranced."

Susan Stewart of The New York Times thought the series was "perfectly calibrated" for children and older viewers. Entertainment Weekly's Eileen Clarke wrote, "Tired of all that 'educational' stuff on TV for kids? Here's a show that will let them wallow in the wacky, surf in complete silliness, and bandy in the bizarre." Canadian TV producer Pat Ellingson said "adults will get a kick out of the hosts' comic stylings." Writing for The Sydney Morning Herald, Evan McEvoy called the series "good enough to steal a few viewers from adult morning TV."

=== Awards ===
The Upside Down Show received three awards, all in 2007. Because the series was written and produced in America and filmed in Australia, it was eligible for awards in both countries. The show's opening theme won the Creative Craft Daytime Emmy Award for Main Title Design. The series also received a Parents' Choice Award Silver Honor for Television and a Logie Award in the category Most Outstanding Children's Program.
