= The Umbilical Brothers =

Australian comic duo

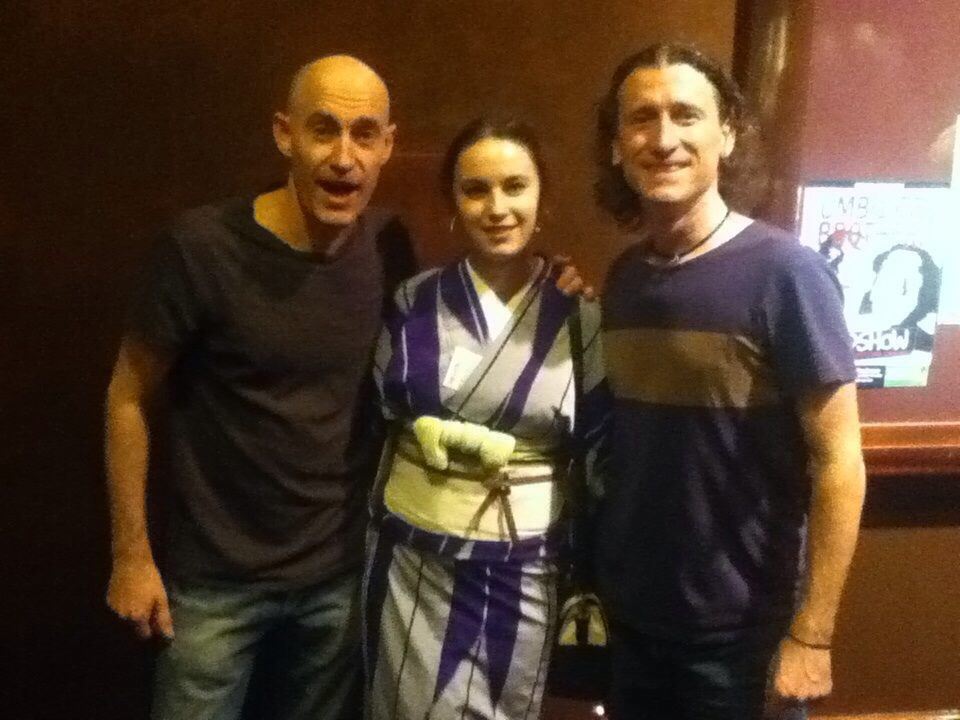
- Dundas (left) and Collins (right) with a fan in 2014
- Notable work: SpeedMouse; The Upside Down Show; Don't Explain; Thwak; Heaven by Storm; The Rehearsal; KIDSHOW (Not Suitable for Children)

Comedy career
- Years active: 1988–present
- Medium: Television, stand-up
- Members: David Collins; Shane Dundas

The Umbilical Brothers are an Australian comedy duo formed in 1988, consisting of David Collins and Shane Dundas. Their performances heavily feature physical comedy and surreal elements. Stage shows by the Umbilical Brothers include Heaven by Storm (1996), Thwack (1999), SpeedMouse (2001), Don't Explain (2007), and Kidshow: Not Suitable For Children (2015).

In 2006, Collins and Dundas created and starred in a children's comedy series called The Upside Down Show, which won a Daytime Emmy Award and a Logie Award for Most Outstanding Children's Program. The series was inspired by the Umbilical Brothers' adult-oriented comedy act SpeedMouse.

The duo's other television appearances include regular skits on The Sideshow and guest performances on the Late Show with David Letterman, The Tonight Show with Jay Leno, The Late Show with Stephen Colbert, and Rove.

== Beginnings ==
The Umbilical Brothers — nicknamed "Umbies" — started performing professionally in the early 1990s. Their collaborations began when Collins and Dundas were both studying at Theatre Nepean's three-year acting course at the University of Western Sydney. A year later, in a jazz class, Collins broke Dundas' nose during a dance move. Their tutors, perhaps believing a burgeoning comedy partnership should wait until after graduation, put Dundas and Collins in separate classes. The pair defied this, sneaking into the auditorium afterhours to play with the PA system and invent moves to match.

== Style ==
The Umbilical Brothers' performances combine mime with ordinary dialogue and vocal sound effects. They use puppetry, pantomiming, slapstick, mimicry and audience participation, and make scant use of props and lighting. After having performed for years, their routines are highly scripted. Their style can be described as simply "microphonic mime".

== Performances ==
They have performed on the Late Show with David Letterman, The Tonight Show with Jay Leno, The Late Show with Stephen Colbert, Broadway, Rove, Sarvo, Good News Week (expressly for the 'So You Think You Can Mime' segment) and The Sideshow. They have also performed at the Cat Laughs, Melbourne International Comedy Festival, Just for Laughs, Sydney Opera House, Adelaide Fringe Festival, Tampere Theatre Festival and Edinburgh Festival Fringe, and also at Woodstock 1999.

The Umbilical Brothers also guest-starred on Double the Fist. In the episode "Ultimate Weapon", Shane played a pair of mystical guards to the TimeSaw, one who lies and one who tells the truth. Both characters explode when The Womp tricks them into doing the opposite of their role. David won best actor at the world's biggest short film competition, Tropfest with Silencer, which he also co-wrote, co-directed and starred in. He also co-wrote and starred in The Luck Child for the Sydney Theatre Company, which won best production at Sydney Theatre Awards and Adelaide Fringe. He has also starred in the feature Red Christmas, as well as the TV shows Drop Dead Weird, Oh Yuck!, True Murder, The Letdown and Disney's Book of Once Upon a Time. Short films include Puppets Versus People: Asylum (which has over a million views), Tay Man, Emissary, The Detectives Of Noir Town and The Kiss. His voice over work includes Helmut, King Dino: Journey to Fire Mountain and Cat God.

In August 2006, the Umbilical Brothers began appearing as the main characters on the Logie Award winning children's television program The Upside Down Show. The show, developed by Sesame Workshop for the Noggin channel, makes extensive use of their particular style of mime and humour. In December 2006, in a New York Post interview, Shane Dundas expressed doubts about the return of the show for a second season. On 1 June 2007, the Umbilical Brothers announced on their website that the series would not be renewed for a second season, and that Noggin USA had decided to end The Upside Down Show after a single season.

In 2014, the Umbilical Brothers provided the voices for Arnie and Barney in the Maya the Bee film trilogy, and the spin-off "Arnie & Barney" is scheduled for release in 2026.

In 2017, the Umbilical Brothers became the storytellers on the Disney mini-series The Book of Once Upon a Time for season 3.

In 2021, the Umbilical Brothers took their new live show "The Distraction" across Australia, including Brisbane (at QPAC), Western Australia and Sydney. The show features David and Shane using props and green screens, whilst using special effects to create the show.

== Shows ==
The Umbilical Brothers have performed seven shows, five of which appear as DVDs:

- SpeedMouse: Taking advantage of the latest advances in performance technology, the boys have upgraded their acting to digital. Using this technology they are able to immediately jump to any routine or fast-forward through the boring bits. Unfortunately, the remote control has gone missing. Tensions arise when their newly hired roadie clashes with David — he points out that there is no need for a roadie as there are no props or scenery to move. The situation gets worse when their show controller, Tina, starts playing mind games with Shane. The conflict continues throughout the show.
- The Upside Down Show: A series of 13 comedic episodes first appearing on Noggin, starring Shane and David as two brothers living in an apartment with many doors. The show was released through five DVD volumes in Australia, each including two-three episodes each.
- Don't Explain: a selection of tangent skits that contain no overall plot; the title is a reference to this. There are, however, continuing themes throughout the show, one of which is Dave's attempt to get the hand-held microphone off Shane; this leads to a climax in which they both have microphones and have a Face, Race and Chase Off. There is also a dog, which is first seen in their first skit of their show, and is the main focus of the second. Another is the performance of European Visual comedy by Hans and Klaus. Conflict again is one of the main factors keeping the show entertaining.
- Thwak!: a modified version of Don't Explain (not available on DVD)
- Heaven by Storm: a more plot-based show by the duo. After dying pre-show, Shane and David meet with God, who tells them that only one of them can enter Heaven. Due to their being unable to agree (and other issues), God sends them back to perform the show and resolve their differences. This culminates in Dave having a slight mental breakdown, shortly after which Shane tells Dave that there is a new character in the show, which Dave then finds out is a cricket which he had accidentally killed beforehand. Shane then chases Dave throughout the show trying to get money "or just 20c" from Dave to help pay for the cricket's funeral.
- The Rehearsal: A new show with video effects including "shadow".
- Not Suitable For Children: Shavid and Dane attempt to make a show for kids, with horrifying results.
- The Distraction: With the help of live special effects, The Umbies appear on stage and screen simultaneously.

== Other appearances ==
In 2022, Dundas and Collins appeared in The Tourist as helicopter pilots who help Jamie Dornan's character find his way in the country. Collins also played Smeg in the 2024 film Furiosa: A Mad Max Saga and a sound mixer named Ray in The Fall Guy.

In 2025, Dundas and Collins appeared in the Australian touring production of The 39 Steps alongside Ian Stenlake and Lisa McCune.

== Video albums ==
Title	Details	Certification
SpeedMouse: Live from the Sydney Opera House	Released: 2004	ARIA: 2× Platinum
Don't Explain: Live from the Athenaeum theatre in Melbourne	Released: 2007	
Heaven By Storm: Live from Regal Theatre	Released: 2010	
The Rehearsal	Released: 2014	
Not Suitable for Children	Released: 2017	

== Singles ==
Title	Year
"Don't Dance to This"	2002

== Awards and nominations ==
=== ARIA Music Awards ===
The ARIA Music Awards is an annual awards ceremony that recognises excellence, innovation, and achievement across all genres of Australian music.

Year	Nominee / work	Award	Result	Ref.
2002	"Don't Dance to This"	Best Comedy Release	Nominated	
2005	The Umbilical Brothers	Best Comedy Release	Nominated	
2008	Don't Explain	Best Comedy Release	Nominated	

=== Mo Awards ===
The Australian Entertainment Mo Awards (commonly known informally as the Mo Awards), were annual Australian entertainment industry awards. They recognise achievements in live entertainment in Australia from 1975 to 2016. The Umbilical Brothers won seven awards in that time.

Year	Nominee / work	Award	Result (wins only)
1993	The Umbilical Brothers	Comedy Group of the Year	Won
1994	The Umbilical Brothers	Comedy Group of the Year	Won
1995	The Umbilical Brothers	Comedy Group of the Year	Won
1996	The Umbilical Brothers	Comedy Group of the Year	Won
1997	The Umbilical Brothers	Comedy Group of the Year	Won
2001	The Umbilical Brothers	Comedy Group of the Year	Won
2002	The Umbilical Brothers	Comedy Group of the Year	Won
