= Next Stop Hollywood =

Next Stop Hollywood is an Australian observational documentary television series directed by Gary Doust and produced by Matchbox Pictures. It follows six ambitious Australian actors competing for roles in Los Angeles during the frenzied TV pilot season. The six-part series was screened on ABC1 in 2013.

== Cast ==
- Alycia Debnam-Carey, 18
- HaiHa Le, 29
- Penelope Mitchell, 22
- Michael Clarke-Tokely, 22
- Craig Anderson, 35
- Luke Pegler, 30

== Episodes ==
- Episode 1–8 January 2013

The excitement, frustrations, fears and tears as six actors – Alycia, HaiHa, Penny, Craig, Luke and Michael - set off from Australia.

- Episode 2–15 January 2013

Alycia scores two major auditions after only two weeks in Hollywood.

- Episode 3–22 January 2013

It’s week three in LA. Penelope gets a Hollywood agent and is in the running for a role in a major feature film.

- Episode 4–29 January 2013

A month into pilot season and things are heating up for Alycia.

- Episode 5–5 February 2013

Alycia goes to Canada to meet a film director. Luke realises he needs to re-focus.

- Episode 6–12 February 2013

It is the final week of pilot season for the cast and this coincides with Hollywood's night-of-nights - the Oscars.
