= The Doomsday Machine (book) =

2012 book by Martin Cohen and Andrew McKillop

- Author: Martin Cohen; Andrew McKillop
- Language: English
- Subject: nuclear industry, nuclear energy, energy economics, social science
- Publisher: Palgrave Macmillan
- Publication date: March 27, 2012
- Publication place: United States
- Media type: Print, digital
- Pages: 256
- ISBN: 978-0230338340
- OCLC: 809956089
- Dewey Decimal: 333.792'4—dc23
- LC Class: HD9698.A2C567 2012

The Doomsday Machine: The High Price of Nuclear Energy, the World's Most Dangerous Fuel is a 2012 book by Martin Cohen and Andrew McKillop which addresses a broad range of concerns regarding the nuclear industry, the economics and environmental aspects of nuclear energy, nuclear power plants, and nuclear accidents. The book has been described by The New York Times as "a polemic on the evils of splitting the atom".

== Synopsis ==
=== Economic fundamentals ===
"The usual rule of thumb for nuclear power is that about two thirds of the generation cost is accounted for by fixed costs, the main ones being the cost of paying interest on the loans and repaying the capital..."

Areva, the French nuclear plant operator, for example, offers that 70 percent of the cost of a kWh of nuclear electricity is accounted for by the fixed costs from the construction process. In the foreword to the book, Steve Thomas, Professor of Energy Studies at the University of Greenwich in the UK, states that "the economic realities of rapidly escalating costs and insurmountable financing problems... will mean that the much-hyped nuclear renaissance will one day be remembered as just another 'nuclear myth'."

In discussions about the economics of nuclear power, the authors explain, what is often not appreciated is that the cost of equity, that is, companies using their own funds to pay for new plants, is generally higher than the cost of debt. Another advantage of borrowing may be that "once large loans have been arranged at low interest rates—perhaps with government support—the money can then be lent out at higher rates of return".

=== Environmental platform ===
As Matthew Wald in the New York Times noted, despite being at its heart environmentalist, the book challenges certain Green orthodoxies, notably the idea that whatever the risks of nuclear energy, the threat from man-made climate change is greater.

As Chiara Proietti Silvestri wrote in a review for the Italian Energy journal Energia in the Doomsday Machine, the authors argue that the fight against pollution from CO_{2} generated mostly by the human activities and described as be the primary cause of rising temperatures at the global level thus becomes a "simple story" told by a club dominated from Anglophone countries in an attempt to defend and promote particular national interests. Reducing huge national subsidies to domestic coal industries and promoting the lucrative market for nuclear power stations being the case in point.

The book describes how fossil fuels remain the main source of energy for the world, while nuclear power manages to meet only three percent of the needs of world energy. This leads to the question: why is the figure so low when it is often read that nuclear is a key part of the "world energy mix"? The authors explain that the trick is in the "fiddling" of statistics, writing that the "key point about world energy is that it is almost all thermal. Whether it is created by burning coal, oil or gas, or firewood or dung, or even running nuclear power plants, the first thing produced is heat".

=== Historical perspective ===
Although nuclear power is still today presented as the energy of future ("the first myth"), its roots are paradoxically in the speech "Atoms for Peace", by President Eisenhower. The authors state that this history shows that the origins of nuclear power lie with military needs, and are anything but peaceful, and that Eisenhower's speech itself was an attempt to distract the world from the tests of the US hydrogen bomb. Scientists — from Albert Einstein and Georges Lemaître to Enrico Fermi and Robert Oppenheimer — come in for criticism for serving the same military strategies.

The history of nuclear power is also marked by the slogan — "too cheap to meter" — described as the foundation of another myth. The book argues that nuclear power is not and has never been cheap but rather found the resources to tap public subsidies, special systems of taxation, loans government and other beneficial guarantees. The arrival of the liberalization of the electrical market has had a strong impact on the nuclear industry, revealing the true costs (e.g. the over-run in costs on the new EPR at Olkiluoto in Finland).

This leads to "tricks" to manipulate figures (cost projections of construction, decommissioning and insurance schemes), the extension of the life of the reactors, the reuse of the depleted fuel) in order to conceal the fundamental non-affordability. Today, according to the authors, the nuclear lobby triumphantly describes the new order flow, especially in developing countries, where the "environment tends to remain a 'free good'", and there is a "cultural indifference to public hazard and risk" all of which, they argue, raises new concerns about the environmental protection, about technical expertise and political instability.

== Reception ==
A central theme of the book is the issue of the true, economic, cost of nuclear electricity. The preface by Steve Thomas indicates the information density with which the authors construct their arguments, expressed nonetheless in witty and tight language, as the Italian Energia review put it, while according to Kirukus: "The authors deliver a convincing account of the partnership between industry and government (essential because nuclear plants require massive subsidies) to build wildly expensive generators whose electricity remains uncompetitive without more subsidies." In another review, science policy writer Jon Turney stated that the "strongest suit" of the book was "energy economics and supply data".

New York Times' Matthew L. Wald analyzes the argument put forth in the Doomsday Machine that "even if global warming science was not explicitly invented by the nuclear lobby, the science could hardly suit the lobby better". He comments, "In fact, the [nuclear] industry continues to argue that in the United States it is by far the largest source of zero-carbon energy, and recently began a campaign of upbeat ads to improve its image." Finding the claim that "In almost every country — usually for reasons completely unrelated to its ability to deliver electricity — there is almost universal political support for nuclear power" is "probably an exaggeration" in the case of Japan post-Fukushima and Germany, Wald agrees that "two countries with enormous demand for electricity and not much hand-wringing over global warming, are planning huge reactor construction projects". Wald notes that, even in Japan, the "catastrophe plays in some quarters as a reason to build new reactors".

New Scientist's Fred Pearce panned the book, calling it "mendacious and frequently anti-scientific", remarking that it "combines hysterical opposition to all things nuclear with an equally deranged climate-change denialism".

== See also ==
- List of books about nuclear issues
- List of books about renewable energy
- List of pro-nuclear environmentalists
- Contesting the Future of Nuclear Power
- Nuclear or Not?
- Reaction Time (book)
- Non-Nuclear Futures
