= The Philosopher =

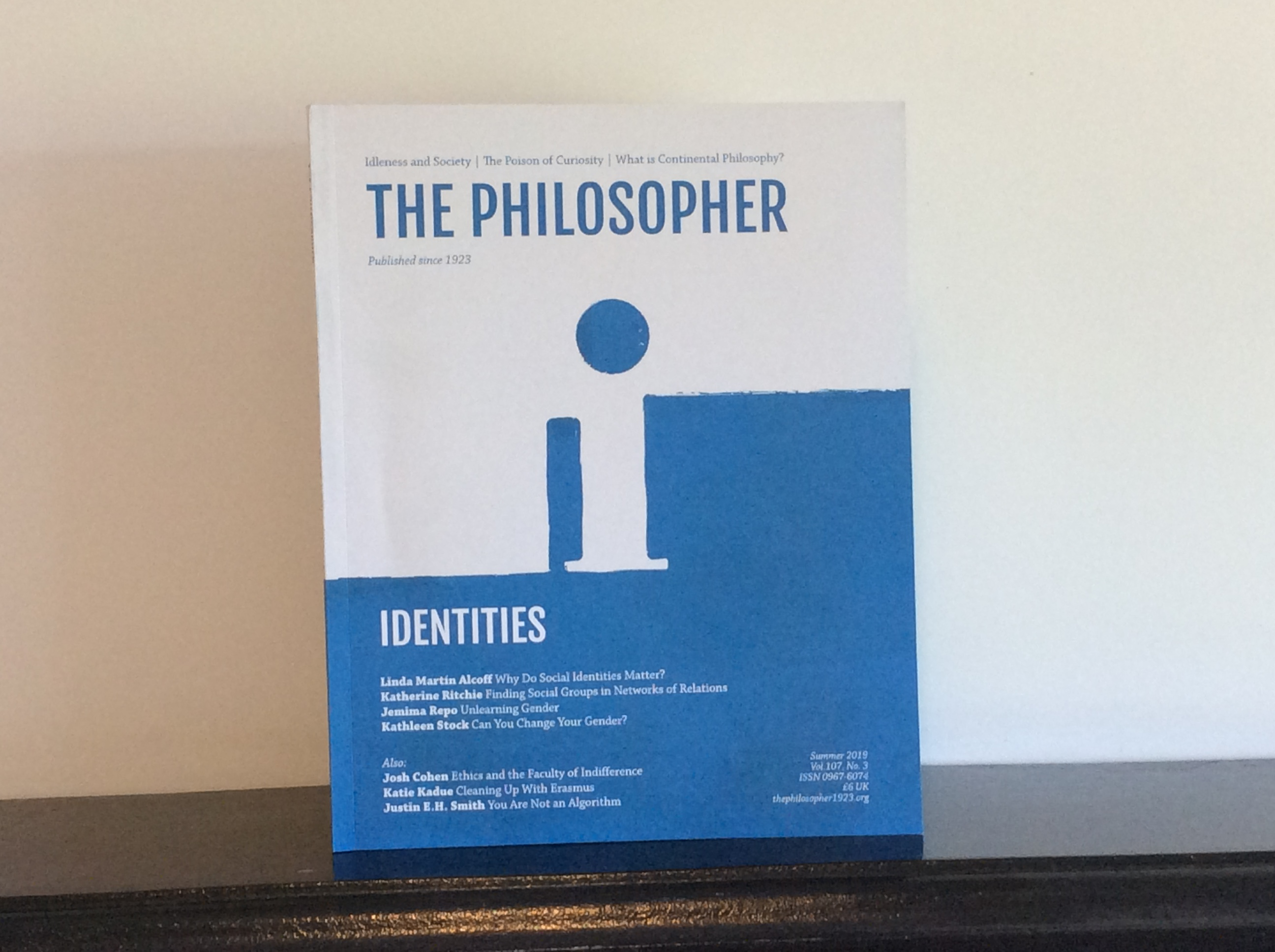
- Discipline: Philosophy
- Language: English
- Edited by: Martin Cohen (online edition), Anthony Morgan (print edition)

Publication details
- History: 1923–present
- Frequency: Quarterly

Standard abbreviations
- ISO 4: Philosopher

Indexing
- ISSN: 0967-6074 (print); 2398-1458 (web)
- OCLC no.: 5455998

Links
- Online edition website; Print edition website

The Philosopher is a long-running periodical, established in 1923 by the Philosophical Society of England. Originally in print format, following a split in the mid-2010s the publication now exists in two competing formats.

== History ==
The Philosopher is a long-running periodical that was established in 1923 in order to provide a forum for new ideas across the entire range of philosophical topics, in the clearest and plainest language. Its first issue quoted A.S. Rappoport in A Primer of Philosophy (1904) that:

There is a prevalent notion that philosophy is a pursuit to be followed only by expert thinkers on abstract subjects, that it deals with the pale ghosts of conceptions whose domain is abstract thought, but which have no application to real life. This is a mistake... Man sees the various phenomena of life and nature, forms conceptions and ideas, and then tries to reason and to find out the relation existing between these various facts and phenomena... When man acts in this way we say he philosophises.

The Philosopher was the official publication of the Philosophical Society of England, a charitable organization founded ten years earlier in 1913. The society existed "to promote the study of practical philosophy among the general public", to bring together professional philosophers and non-professionals, to bring philosophical ideas and problems to the public attention, and to encourage wider discussion of both traditional and topical philosophical issues. As part of fulfilling these functions, the society founded The Philosopher as its own journal in addition to running local groups, lectures, workshops, and conferences. The Society, in its original form, ceased to exist in 2014, although its chairman at the time, Michael Bavidge, claimed both its name and assets for his own local group of the society, the 'Newcastle Group'.

A series of arguments internal to the Philosophical Society of England in 2014, led to the publication being split into two formats; an online-only edition, led by long-term editor Martin Cohen, and an initially print-only but soon print-and-online edition, originally led by PSE chair Michael Bavidge. Both publications claim to be direct continuations of The Philosopher prior to the split.

=== Online-Only Edition ===
The purely online edition of The Philosopher describes itself as "a forum for short, original, brilliant and accessible articles". Articles are edited for clarity by the editorial team, with a focus on making content "clear to the interested reader". The online-only edition publishes articles on a wide range of philosophical topics, as well as book reviews. Recent notable contributors to the online edition include Mel Thompson and Urmila Bhoola.

=== Print and Online Edition ===
The print and online edition of The Philosopher describes itself as a "forum for cutting-edge philosophical discussions to take place, prioritizing exciting up-and-coming thinkers as much as well-established leading figures." The publication is written for the general non-academic public, with a focus on accessibility.

Topics range from core philosophical problems to discussions of current social and political issues. Recent contributors include Kathleen Stock, Mary Midgley, Timothy Williamson, Jason Stanley, Linda Martín Alcoff, Olúfẹ́mi O. Táíwò (whose article in the 2020 print edition helped bring his work to wide attention), Martin Hägglund, Michael Della Rocca, Steven Nadler, Dan Zahavi, Todd McGowan, Serene Khader, Fay Bound Alberti, Brooke Holmes, Catherine Wilson, Michael Lewis, Frederick Neuhouser and Lea Ypi.

== Notable articles ==
Historically interesting or notable articles that were identified and recovered by Martin Cohen for the online edition include:

- G. K. Chesterton on "The Need for a Philosophy", Volume 1, 1923
- "Individual Psychology and Education", by John Dewey, Volume XII, 1934
- Erwin Schrödinger on "Science, Art and Play", Volume XIII 1935
- Moritz Schlick on "Unanswerable Questions", Volume XIII, 1935

== Editors ==
The editors-in-chief of the journal have been:

- 1923–1948: Ada Sheridan, W. H. S. Dumphreys, Thomas Greenwood
- 1949–1972: C. S. Flick, Victor Rienaecker, A. J. Sinclair-Burton
- 1973–1988: George Colbran, Alan Holloway, Geoffrey Brown
- 1989–2013: Keith Dowling, Michael Bavidge, Martin Cohen
- 2013–present: Martin Cohen (for the online-only edition)
- 2013-2018: Michael Bavidge (for the print-and-online edition)
- 2018–present: Anthony Morgan (for the print-and-online edition)

== See also ==
- List of philosophy journals
