= Doomsday Machine =

Doomsday Machine may refer to:

- Doomsday device, a hypothetical weapon which could destroy all life on the Earth
- Doomsday Machine (film), a 1972 science-fiction film
- The Doomsday Machine (book), a 2012 non-fiction book arguing that nuclear energy is a kind of 'Doomsday' strategy
- "The Doomsday Machine" (Star Trek: The Original Series), a 1967 episode of Star Trek: The Original Series
- Doomsday Machine (album), a 2005 album by melodic death metal band Arch Enemy
- The Doomsday Machine: Confessions of a Nuclear War Planner (2017), book by Daniel Ellsberg
