= Craig Anderson (actor) =

Australian filmmaker

- Born: 1 November 1978 (age 47)
- Education: University of Western Sydney
- Occupations: Director, actor, producer

Craig Anderson (born 1 November 1978) is an Australian director, producer and actor best known for his comedic turns in the Australian television series' Double the Fist, Review with Myles Barlow, Laid, and award-winning short films Life in a Datsun, Demon Datsun, and Life in a Volkswagen. He directed the horror feature film Red Christmas.

Anderson is a physical media enthusiast and has a VHS collection with over 8500 tapes.

== Early life ==
Anderson grew up in St Clair, New South Wales, a suburb of Western Sydney.

Anderson has a First Class Honors in Performance and Theory from the University of Western Sydney.

== Career ==
Anderson first gained success as a filmmaker in 1999, when he collaborated with university friend Brian Moses to create the short film Life in a Datsun. The short was screened at the Tropfest and St Kilda Film Festival to great acclaim. In 2000, they followed it up with Life in a Volkswagen.

The success of Anderson's short films with Moses lead to the Australian Broadcasting Corporation commissioning their late night TV series Double the Fist. The show is a satire of lifestyle television and features the characters pursuing the "most extreme lifestyle choices they can make". Anderson was frustrated with representation on Australian television and wanted the show to be "lower-class people having cool fantasies and action adventures". In a shock upset, the series beat Kath & Kim to win the 2004 Australian Film Institute award for best comedy series. The series returned for a second season in 2008.

In 2008, Anderson also featured in three episodes of the ABC TV show Review With Myles Barlow. Anderson served as associate producer and first assistant director on the series

In 2013, Anderson was the subject of a six-part Observational Documentary series Next Stop Hollywood, which followed him around Hollywood during pilot season. In 2014, he shared directing duties on Australia's first Indigenous sketch Comedy series Black Comedy. Anderson and fellow director Bec Cole won the AACTA award for Best Direction in TV Light Entertainment or Reality Series for the series.

Between directing television projects, in 2016, Anderson directed his first feature film, Red Christmas. The film was inspired by Tony Kaye's exploration of abortion in Lake of Fire. Gary Doust's documentary Horror Movie: A Low Budget Nightmare depicts Anderson's journey creating the film.

In 2023, Anderson started an analytical film podcast called Film Versus Film with Bruce and Herschel Isaacs from The University of Sydney. The hosts compare two wildly different films each episode, in an effort to understand cinematic trends and what defines iconic films. The first season also features a series of reflections on what media influenced them growing up in Western Sydney working-class families during the late 80s and early 90s.

== Filmography ==
=== Film ===
Year	Title	Role	Type
1999	Life in a Datsun	Craig	Short film
2000	Life in a Volkswagen		Short film
2000	Bootmen	Huey's Mate	Feature film
2010	Miscast	Slacker Director 2	Short film
2012	Sparkle		Short film
2012	Sparkle		Short film
2013	The Tenant	The Tenant	Short film
2015	Damsel	John	Film
2016	The Tail Job	Trevor	Feature film
2016	Tay Man	Paul	Tropfest short film
2016	Baby Planet Juice		Short film
2016	Hitnan Pervert	Hitnan	Short film
2017	Horror Movie: A Low Budget Nightmare		Documentary film (the making of Red Christmas)
2017	Spell		Short film
2018	Huff to Huff		Short film

=== Television ===
Year	Title	Role	Type
2000	Video Dare		TV series
2004–08	Double the Fist	Steve Foxx	TV series, 16 episodes
2008	Downtown Rumble	Master	TV series
2008–10	Review with Myles Barlow	Graham / Customer / Clown	TV series, 5 episodes
2010	Charity Hurts	Cop	Video
2011	Laid	Russ	TV series, 1 episode
2011	Bernie		Web series
2011	Late Night Angel Weenie Baby		Web series
2011	Dating Emergency 101	Greg	Web series
2012	Office Correctness	Greg	Video
2012	A Moody Christmas	Counsellor	TV miniseries, 1 episode
2013	Next Stop Hollywood	Himself	Documentary TV series
2013	The Elegant Gentleman's Guide to Knife Fighting	Various characters	TV miniseries, 6 episodes
2014	The Moodys	Dean	TV miniseries, 1 episode
2014	Black Comedy	Guest cast	TV series, 2 episodes
2015	Alt Tab	Voice	Video
2015	Dirty Bird	Cop	TV series, 1 episode
2015	Maximum Choppage	Policeman Phil	TV series, 1 episode
2015	Miso Hungry		Documentary
2017	The Lost Tapes	Baba	TV miniseries
2017	Jays of Our Lives	Security Guard	TV series, 1 episode
2017	Tiger Cops	Superintendent Anderson	TV series, 1 episode
2018	Sando	Another Vic	TV miniseries, 1 episode
2018	Nippers of Dead Bird Bay	Turtle Poacher	TV series, 2 episodes
2018	Fresh Blood: Pilot Season	Lou	TV series, 1 episode
2021	The Moth Effect	Bartender / Miffed Bekchman / Fan / Benchman	TV miniseries, 3 episodes
2025	Westerners	Sleeping Uncle	TV series, 1 episode

== As director ==
=== Film ===
Year	Title	Type
1999	Life in a Datsun	Short film
2000	Life in a Volkswagen	Short film
2016	Red Christmas	Feature film

=== Television ===
Year	Title	Type
2004–08	Double the Fist	TV series
2014	Black Comedy	TV series
2015	How Not to Behave	TV series
2021	The Moth Effect	TV miniseries
2021	History Bites Back	Documentary TV series
2023	We Interrupt This Broadcast	TV series
