= Double the Fist =

- Double the Fist
- Created by: Craig Anderson, Bryan Moses, Doug Bayne, Tony Walters
- Starring: Craig Anderson, Bryan Moses, Doug Bayne, Tony Walters
- Country of origin: Australia
- No. of series: 2
- No. of episodes: 16 (list of episodes)

Production
- Producers: Craig Anderson, Bryan Moses, Doug Bayne, Tony Walters
- Running time: 26 Minutes

Original release
- Network: ABC
- Release: 2004 – 2008

Double the Fist is an Australian satirical television show which aired on ABC Television from 2004 to 2008. It follows the misadventures of four men and their pursuit of "fist-worthiness": host Steve Foxx (Craig Anderson), and his three offsiders; Rod Foxx (Bryan Moses), Mephisto (Doug Bayne), and The Womp (Tony Walters). The series has also been broadcast in the United Kingdom (Ftn), Canada (BBCK), Spain (Buzz), New Zealand (TV2) and Brazil.

== Synopsis ==
The show parodies many things about popular culture, primarily being a spoof of shows such as Jackass; whereas they perform stunts designed to injure and/or humiliate an individual, the Fist team do things that would kill them. Such as jumping off cliffs, being hit by trucks, getting shot in the head, etc. These dangerous stunts and outlandish actions are usually achieved with the use of computer-generated imagery. One of the most innovative and noteworthy features of Double the Fist is its extensive and imaginative use of CGI, especially considering that the programme was produced for a very low budget, even by Australian standards ($250,000 for all 8 episodes).

== Characters ==
- Steve Foxx (Craig Anderson) is the host of Double the Fist. He invented the concept of "fistworthiness" and "betterment through extremities." An expert at crushing all that is weak, Steve is finally ready to begin his War on Weakness. However, lately, Steve has had trouble controlling his team: Rod feels underappreciated, Mephisto has become rebellious, Womp has been fired for incompetence and Panda has fallen for a mime. Steve's brutal double-fisted rule seems to be slipping.
- Rod Foxx (Bryan Moses) (or "the Hot Rod" as he sometimes calls himself) is the younger brother of Steve Foxx. It is said he attends a sporting institute and lists his job as an 'all-round athlete'. His main interests include physical activity and singing. Although he does have a reasonable amount of sporting talent and can be successful on the dating scene, his ego knows no limits and he seems to be delusional. He has 'released' a single, entitled "I C U (Picture Perfect)", which details a man's (Rod's) obsession with a (presumably) under-age school girl as he stalks her and takes pictures of her changing and at the pool without her knowledge. Has a severe addiction to sexual harassment, resulting in him being shot, slashed, and stabbed in that order.
- Mephisto (Doug Bayne) (aka James Wenham) may or may not have been a security guard at one time or another, but it is certain that he did take a three-week training course in security guarding, and has retained some of the knowledge from that course. According to the Double the Fist website, he is on the run from multiple taxation agencies. He was at one time temporarily possessed by an Aztec demigod, and at another time the leader of an army of medieval re-enactors. It would be safe to say that Mephisto is of questionable sanity. (By safe, it is meant "probably true"; questioning Mephisto's sanity would likely land you in a position of danger if Mephisto found out).
- The Womp (Tony Walters) (aka Womp aka Christopher Bradley aka Olaf) used to have a day job performing backbreaking labour, and was also an amateur wrestler. However, a groin injury on the job forced him to give up his wrestling career. He was then offered, and accepted, a position on Double the Fist. The Womp is also mentally disabled, due to a brain injury when he was a child. Briefly grew antlers to indicate newfound responsibility, but lost them in the next episode. His catchphrase, whenever he was asked a question about how he feels was "Ah, yeah...pretty good".
- Tara (Hollie Andrew) is a vending machine assassin introduced in episode 10. She joined the Fist team after Steve destroyed the local council and captured the jar of tokens that control her, but she was effectively killed when the tokens were destroyed in Episode 13. Rod revived her by hotwiring her in Episode 16, and she met her end in the Great Battle.
- Blue Womp is a clone of Womp, with identical physical features, although he is more self-centered and mean. He is so-called because he wears blue to avoid confusion with the other Womp (who always wears orange). Savagely beaten by Steve for stepping too far out of line in episode 5, he returns in episode 8, now a whimpering wreck, where Steve makes him shoot himself with a cannon to prove he is sorry.
- Tina T (Neridah Waters) is introduced in episode five, as a replacement for the missing-in-action Mephisto. She appears to be smarter than the rest of the team, but truthfully this is not saying much. She and Rod had a brief romance, which ended when Rod tried to grope her while he thought she was dead. After slicing Rod's spine open in the next episode, Tina seems to be satisfied with her revenge and has not been seen or heard from since.
- Panda (Lawrence Carmichael) is just that - a person in a panda suit. The character is almost always referred to as female. She will often show up to provide opposition (such as in episodes three and five), but will sometimes help Steve out by moderating races or chasing down enemies. In series two, Panda falls in love with a mime, of which Steve disapproves. Panda is then accidentally killed in a trap set up by Steve in a botched attempt to force the mime (who was mute) to speak. It is revealed on the DVD's "How to Make Double the Fist" featurette that Craig Anderson usually plays Panda.
- Phillip Nugent First introduced in episode 2; Extreme Makeover. He is the mayor of Kanangra council and stops the Fist team recording the show in Kanangra. Although this is the only episode he appears in, he is frequently mentioned and criticised in other episodes and also sends a letter complaining to ABC about the Double the Fist show. On the Double the Fist website it is revealed that he is the cousin of the host of Town and Country.

== Series one ==
Steve will set the Fist team a task. Completing this task will result in the presentation of the "Full Fist", which earns an individual respect amongst the 'extreme community'. The team may have to compete with each other or may have to work together. Steve Foxx is the only person who can present a Full Fist. Characters die frequently, sometimes several times in an episode. Footage of the team attempting the task is interspersed with various recurring segments.

Recurring segments
Segment	Structure
Letter of the Weak	Steve reads out a letter he received during the week, and answers. All the letters in this segment are false. Steve is usually quite mean - most responses end with Steve yelling "You make me sick!" or "Don't ever watch this show again!"
Mephisto Knows	Mephisto gives an editorial on whatever takes his fancy. Athletes, vegetarians, and anti-marketers all come in for a serving. Mephisto is perhaps at his most unhinged during these segments. In the final episode, it is revealed that Mephisto is possibly gay due to his preparing to do an angry Mephisto Knows to rave about heterosexualism, but this is never brought up again.
Fistory	The Womp presents what he considers to be fistworthy figures in world history. He often nominates bizarre choices, such as the iceberg that sunk the Titanic. Although there is only one Fistory during the show, the DVD contains numerous other ones that were cut for reasons of time, and because all except the one aired, few were humorous (The Chinese get Full Fist for making long trips delivering rice).
Rod sporting clips	Although they have no collective name, there are numerous demonstrations of Rod's sporting prowess, including Fist Pong (ping pong with an insane number of balls).
What Was Weak?	Reversed footage of Panda smashing something with a cricket bat. The viewer has five seconds to guess from the rubble what it was that Panda destroyed. Items include a garden gnome and an ostrich egg.
How Low Will You Go?	Steve hits the streets of Australia to find how little money people need to be offered to do something disgusting. He will set out the challenge (such as drinking water drained from rubbish bins or eating five jars of mayonnaise in under an hour) and take bids. The person with the lowest bid can attempt the challenge, and if they succeed they get the money. Note that these segments feature genuine passers-by, unlike the scripted pieces that make up the rest of the show.

== Series two ==
Series 2 differs from Series 1 in that it follows a single storyline, which is usually affected by continuity. Each episode contains a separate part of Steve's plan, and a new award, the 'Man of Fist', is presented to the most fistworthy team member each week. In the eye of the public, it is often seen as disliked when compared to season one.

However, the second series featured an in-depth storyline (possibly added to increase the show's praise), and vastly improved digital effects. Some minor aspects that were made in or changed in Season 2 included Rod's appearance being made more memorable by a mullet adorned with lightning bolts shaved into the sides of his head. Steve is vastly less tolerant of any sign of weakness expressed by his team (possibly due to their failure in Episode 7), often physically abusing them for no reason at all, and losing his apparent ability to appear anywhere to commentate on the team's progress. Kanangra is no longer a factor but is mentioned in Episode 2 to show Steve's familiarity with councils. The characters were seen talking more, hence we learn that Womp is mostly disliked, and Rod and Mephisto have a minor friendship. We also learn that Steve is not the creator of Fistworthiness, having learned it from ancient monks. However, we also learn that Steve was displeased with the peaceful use of Fistworthiness and changed it into his violent version (which nonetheless proved to be less powerful).

== History ==
The four men who play the central characters have a long history. Anderson, Moses, and Walters met at the University of Western Sydney - Anderson and Walters 'performing absurdist theatre' and Moses making amateur films. The three teamed up to make a short film entitled Life in a Datsun which won the best comedy award at the 1999 Tropfest film festival. It was here they met Bayne, who caught their eye with his computer-generated effects and his 30-second film called God Saves the Titanic. The four men then made Video Dare, a spoof reality show for SBS, which received 100 complaints. From 2002 to 2003, the team, minus Anderson who was lecturing at the time, made Saturday Morning Fly, a kid's music/comedy program for ABC. Their work on Video Dare and Saturday Morning Fly allowed the team to perfect their use of special effects and the pilot for Double the Fist was soon made. It was eventually picked up by the ABC's head of arts and entertainment, Courtney Gibson, and an eight-part series was approved.

The ABC was divided over whether or not to produce a second series. In March 2006, after several attempts by the creators and support from fans via an online petition, the ABC commissioned a second series. Series 2 began on 14 August 2008.

== Awards ==
In 2004, Double the Fist caused some controversy when it won an AFI award in the category of Best Television Comedy- Sit-com or Sketch. According to "From Nobodies to Nobodies," a DVD documentary on Series One, Volume Two, which chronicles the history of the show and its creators up to that point, the main reaction from the general media and public regarding their achievement of the award, ranged from disappointment to downright disgust for some.

One of the main reasons for the outbursts was that amongst the nominees of the 2004 awards was the more prominent Australian comedy Kath & Kim. Compared to that series, Double the Fist was not as well known, and the comedy was deemed by the casual observer as something more akin to the American show Jackass. During a press conference after the ceremony, the boys from the show were asked only one question which was about how it felt to beat Kath & Kim. The following day, many newspaper columnists printed their disgust that such a puerile and juvenile show had been selected by the AFI over the more popular Kath & Kim with one describing it as "the unfunniest joke of the night".

This is, however, a feat the Double the Fist team continues to relish - an extra on the Series One, Volume Two DVD contains instructions on how to make a Double the Fist Box Set using the inside cover of Volume Two and a Kath & Kim Box Set, where one of the instructions involved using a block splitter to destroy the contents of the Kath & Kim Box Set (namely the DVD and the DVD slips) and burning them so they could never be seen again.

Special guest, James Paley appeared in several specials for the series in late 2009 which won him several Logie Award nominations.

== Related media ==
=== Website ===
Craig Anderson and Doug Bayne were working on a new interactive "Double The Fist" website, which was to feature weekly content, tricks and games, and a Steve Foxx blog. The site is no longer available.

=== Merchandise ===
On 14 July 2004, the Double The Fist Volume 1 DVD was released in Australia, which contains episodes 1–4 as well as special features including a documentary called "How to Make Double the Fist", deleted scenes, and a 'photo gallery'. A book was also released that year. On 8 June 2006, the Double The Fist Volume 2 DVD was released, which contains episodes 5-8 and also contains more special features and a never-before-seen episode.

== See also ==
- List of Australian television series
