= Red Christmas =

- Film poster
- Directed by: Craig Anderson
- Written by: Craig Anderson
- Produced by: Craig Anderson; Belinda King; Bryan Moses; Dee Wallace
- Starring: Dee Wallace; Geoff Morrell; David Collins
- Cinematography: Douglas James Burgdorff
- Music by: Helen Grimley
- Production company: Red Christmas
- Distributed by: Umbrella Entertainment; Artsploitation Films
- Release date: June 17, 2016 (Sydney)
- Running time: 82 minutes
- Country: Australia
- Language: English

Red Christmas is a 2016 Australian horror film written, directed, and produced by Craig Anderson.

== Plot ==
Amid anti-abortion protests, a man sets an explosive in an abortion clinic. In the chaos of the explosion, he finds and takes a still-living fetus, raising it as his own.

20 years later, widow Diane hosts Christmas for her family: her brother Joe, oldest daughter Suzy and her reverend husband Peter, heavily pregnant Virginia "Ginny" and her partner Scott, youngest son Jerry, who has Down syndrome, and adopted teenage daughter Hope.

A mysterious cloaked stranger known as "Cletus" arrives and is let inside. After reading a letter addressed to "Mother" and mentioning an abortion clinic he is thrown out of the house and threatened by Joe.

Later, as the family fights inside, Hope is killed outside with an axe by Cletus. Upon discovering her body and calling the police, the family hides in the house, as Diane begins to realize Cletus is her son she tried to abort, due to her husbands illness and the baby having Down Syndrome. Scott is killed when Cletus manages to sneak back into the building. When Joe attempts to drive a car for them to escape, Cletus strangles him to death.

A panicking Ginny begins to give birth with Suzy supporting her, as Diane secures the house and tells Peter about who Cletus is. The sheriff arrives after their earlier call, only to be quickly killed with a bear trap. Cletus confronts Diane but she shoots him and flees. In the commotion of him getting back into the house Diane is trapped in a closet, while Cletus fights Peter in the kitchen. Peter is able to briefly placate him by sharing a prayer and admitting the truth Diane told him, which is overheard by Jerry, however Peter is still killed with a blender. Feeling betrayed by Diane, Jerry confronts her and runs off, instead making peace with Cletus and giving him his hat. After mistaking the two, Diane accidentally fatally shoots Jerry when he approaches her. She continues to distract Cletus as Ginny's child is born. Inspired by the birth, Suzy is determined to kill Cletus, only to be ambushed and killed with an Umbrella by him instead. Cletus begins to strangle Diane, begging her to affirm her maternal love for him. She refuses, falling unconscious.

Ginny tries to hide herself and her newborn upstairs, only to be found and stabbed to death by Cletus, who spares the baby. Diane ambushes him by stabbing him with an anchor chained to her neck and then jumping out of the window, hanging herself and eviscerating Cletus. Police reinforcements arrive, as the sole surviving baby cries.

== Cast ==
- Dee Wallace as Diane
- Geoff Morrell as Joe
- Sarah Bishop as Suzy
- David Collins as Peter
- Janis McGavin as Ginny
- Sam Campbell as Cletus
- Deelia Meriel as Hope
- Gerard Odwyer as Jerry
- Bjorn Stewart as Scott

== Reception ==
On Rotten Tomatoes, the film holds an approval rating of 47% based on 19 reviews, with a weighted average rating of 5.41/10. On Metacritic, which assigns a rating to reviews, the film has a weighted average score of 52 out of 100, based on five critics, indicating "mixed or average reviews".

Eddie Cockrell from Variety called it, "An energetic, candy-colored romp through genre tropes that manages to take its subject matter seriously while poking fun at itself at the same time." Noel Murray from Los Angeles Times wrote in his review on the film, "Red Christmas doesn't have any specific political point of view; it's fraught with contradictions, and should make anyone squeamish. Mostly, it's a tightly constructed, unapologetically nasty little thriller, given depth and weight by Wallace's interpretation of a sweet woman suffering for her past." John DeFore called the film "Gory and offensive, but lacking in the scare department.". DeFore criticized the film's pacing, and lack of humor.

Craig Anderson also made a 100-minute making of documentary, Horror Movie: A Low Budget Nightmare, in which he details the financial struggles of making an indepedant film.
