= SpeedMouse =

- Created by: David Collins; Shane Dundas
- Starring: David Collins; Shane Dundas
- Country of origin: Australia

Production
- Running time: 90 minutes

Original release
- Release: 1999

SpeedMouse is a performance stage show by the Australian comic duo The Umbilical Brothers. The show follows the brothers as they fall under the control of a remote control that can freeze, reverse, and fast-forward their motions. The original version of SpeedMouse was aimed at an adult audience and featured repeated scenes of violence and vulgarity; the Brothers later performed a more family-friendly version with less swearing.

Devised in the late 1990s, the Umbilical Brothers performed the show regularly until 2006. The duo revived the stage show in 2016 in celebration of their 25 years performing as The Umbilical Brothers. The show was an influence for their later television programme The Upside Down Show (2006). Their performance at the Sydney Opera House was filmed for a live DVD, which was released in late 2004.

== Plot ==
Taking advantage of the “latest advances” in performance technology, the boys have upgraded their acting to digital. Using this technology, they are able to jump immediately to any routine or fast forward through the boring bits. Unfortunately, the remote control has gone missing. Tensions arise when their newly hired roadie clashes with David — he points out that there is no need for any roadie, as there are no props or scenery to move. The situation worsens when their show controller Tina starts playing mind games with Shane.

== Cast ==
- David Collins as himself
- Shane Dundas as himself
- Roadie, performed by Tina
- Tina, performed by Roadie
- Mr Fluffy as himself (cameo)
- The Koala as himself (cameo)

== Certifications ==
Region	Certification	Certified units/sales
Australia (ARIA)	2× Platinum	30,000^{^}
^{^} Shipments figures based on certification alone.
