= Martin Hägglund =

Swedish philosopher, literary theorist and scholar

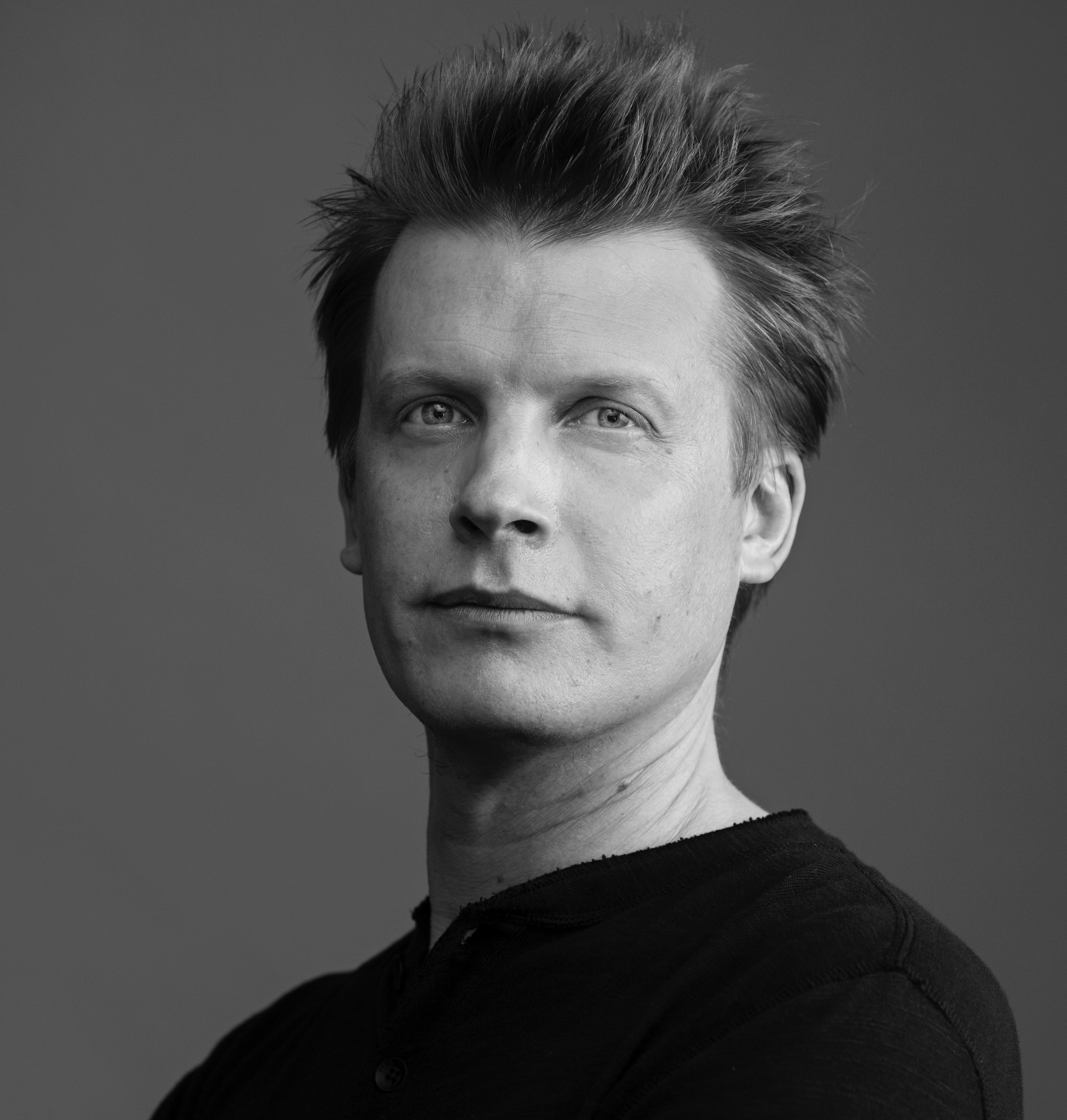
- Born: 23 November 1976 (age 49); Sollentuna parish, Stockholm, Sweden
- Awards: René Wellek Prize (2020); Lenin Award (2024)

Academic background
- Thesis: Chronolibidinal reading: Proust, Woolf, Nabokov (2011)

Academic work
- Era: Contemporary philosophy
- Region: Western philosophy
- School or tradition: Continental philosophy
- Main interests: Political philosophy, literary theory

Martin Hägglund (Swedish: [ˈhɛɡːlɵnd]; born 23 November 1976) is a Swedish philosopher and scholar of modernist literature. He is the Birgit Baldwin Professor of Humanities at Yale University. He is also a member of the Harvard Society of Fellows, serving as a Junior Fellow from 2009 to 2012. Hägglund is the author of This Life: Secular Faith and Spiritual Freedom (2019), Dying for Time: Proust, Woolf, Nabokov (2012), Radical Atheism: Derrida and the Time of Life (2008), and Kronofobi: Essäer om tid och ändlighet (Chronophobia: Essays on Time and Finitude, 2002). He was awarded a Guggenheim Fellowship in 2018 and won the René Wellek Prize in 2020. In 2024 Hägglund was awarded Jan Myrdal’s big prize – The Lenin Award.

== Works ==
=== This Life (2019) ===
In This Life: Secular Faith and Spiritual Freedom (2019), Hägglund pursues a critique of the religious ideal of eternity and reconceives faith in secular terms as the fundamental form of practical commitment. Through new interpretations of G.W.F. Hegel, Karl Marx, and Martin Luther King Jr., Hägglund develops the social and political stakes of his analysis of our temporal existence, arguing that labor under capitalism alienates us from our finite lifetime. Calling for a revaluation of our values, Hägglund presents a vision of democratic socialism as a post-capitalist form of life in which we could truly own our time and recognize our shared freedom.

=== Dying for Time (2012) ===
Dying for Time offers new readings of the problem of temporality in the writings of Marcel Proust, Virginia Woolf, and Vladimir Nabokov. Through an engagement with Sigmund Freud and Jacques Lacan, Hägglund also develops an original theory of the relation between time and desire ("chronolibido"), addressing mourning and melancholia, pleasure and pain, attachment and loss.

=== Radical Atheism (2008) ===
Radical Atheism is a major intervention in deconstruction, offering a novel account of Jacques Derrida's thinking of time and space, life and death, good and evil, self and other. As Hägglund argues, all our commitments presuppose an investment in and care for finite life. Developing a deconstructive account of time, Hägglund shows how Derrida rethinks the constitution of identity, ethics, religion, and political emancipation in accordance with the condition of temporal finitude.

== Personal life ==
(Hans Martin) Hägglund, was born November 23, 1976 in Sollentuna parish, Stockholm county and grew up in Viksjö in Järfälla municipality and the High Coast. His ancestors were peasants and farmers originating in northern Sweden, where he makes a visit every summer. He obtained a B.A. in Philosophy and Literature from Stockholm University in 2001, and subsequent M.A.s at SUNY Buffalo and Cornell University in 2005 and 2007, respectively. He earned his PhD at Cornell University in 2011.

In what has been described as "a historic appointment", in 2012 he became the first person to receive a lifetime professorship at Yale University immediately after receiving his PhD. Since 2015, he has headed the department of comparative literature at the university.

He is the first Swede to be elected to the Harvard Society of Fellows.

On June 11, 2021, the music album 'Distractions In a Capitalist World' by artist and composer Teodor Wolgers was released, with Hägglund appearing on the track 'System Failure' with a narration from his book "This Life".

He has a sister named Karin Hägglund, sometimes referred to as one of Sweden's most accomplished karate practitioners, with five national championships and three Nordic titles. Karin holds a Master's degree in Health Promotion from Karolinska Institutet and is currently pursuing a PhD in Sustainable High Performance Coaching at the Swedish School of Sport and Health Sciences. In 2014, she experienced the loss of her husband of many years to cancer after a year and a half of battling the illness. This tragic experience may have deepened Martin's engagement with the concepts of time and finitude, prompting a shift in focus towards embracing life's fragility in a secular context in order to live a good life.

He is married (August 28, 2021) to Alisa Zhulina (of Russian/Soviet background), artist-scholar, Assistant Professor of Theatre Studies, and the Director of Theatre Studies in the Department of Drama. The couple welcomed their first child (Mathilda Natalia Hägglund (Матюшa)) in April 2022.

== Bibliography ==
- This Life: Secular Faith and Spiritual Freedom, Pantheon Books, 2019.
- Dying for Time: Proust, Woolf, Nabokov, Cambridge, MA: Harvard University Press, 2012.
- Radical Atheism: Derrida and the Time of Life, Stanford: Stanford University Press, Meridian: Crossing Aesthetics, 2008.
- Kronofobi: Essäer om tid och ändlighet (Chronophobia: Essays on Time and Finitude), Stockholm/Stehag: Brutus Östlings Bokförlag Symposion, 2002.
