= Kajsa Ekis Ekman =

Swedish journalist and author (born 1980)

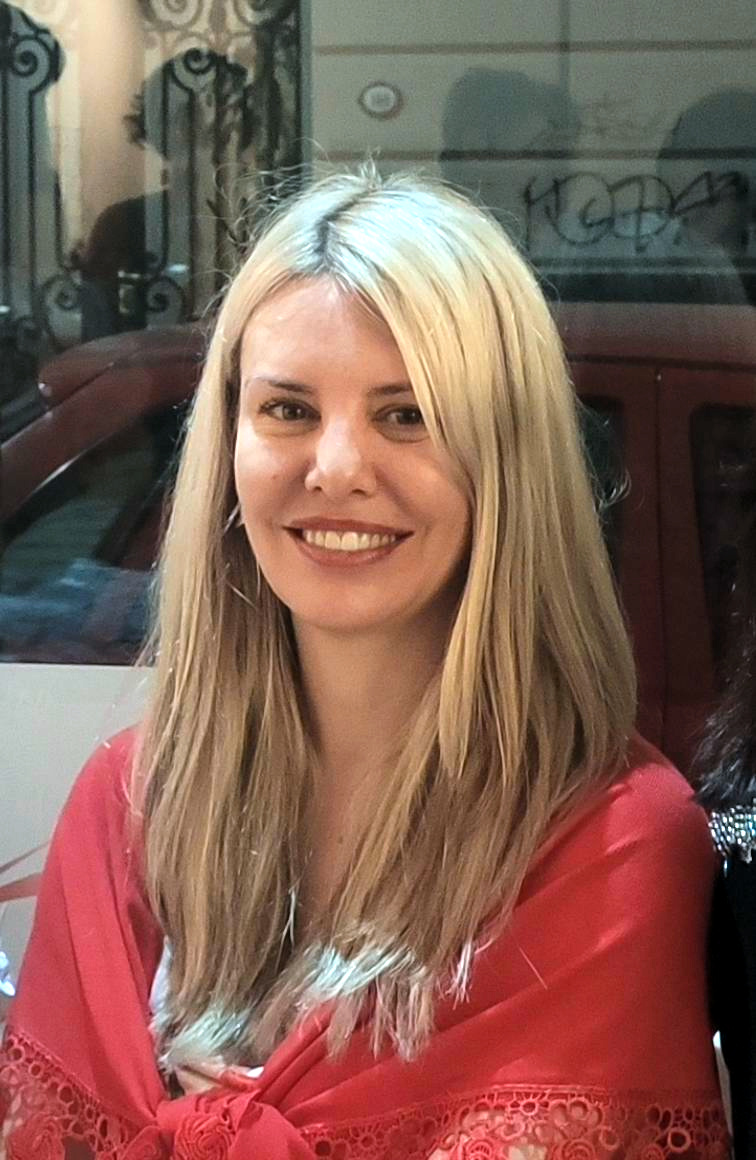
- Ekman in 2023
- Born: 1980 (age 45–46); Stockholm, Sweden
- Occupations: Journalist, author
- Years active: 2005–present
- Awards: Robespierre Prize (2010); Swedish-Greek of the Year (2015); Sara Lidman award (2016); Lenin Award (2020)

Kajsa Ekis Ekman (born 1980) is a Swedish journalist and author. She has written about topics including prostitution, surrogacy, gender, imperialism and capitalism. Ekman lectures internationally on prostitution, surrogacy, and crisis theory. Currently, she is editor-in-chief of Parabol Press.

== Early life ==
Ekman grew up in Stockholm, Sri Lanka and Vietnam. She became involved with the punk movement in her early teens. That led her to engage in political activism.

She participated in the protests at the European Council meetings in Gothenburg 2001, coined the Gothenburg Riots, and has mentioned experiencing a decline in activist movements as an aftermath. During an open house at the Swedish newspaper Dagens Nyheter, she criticised the paper's lack of appeal to young people. Journalist Viggo Cavling, editor of the newspaper's supplement DN på stan, encouraged her to write and submit something herself. This led to a collaboration that sparked her interest in writing. She has a Master of literature from Södertörn University, among other subjects.

== Journalism ==
Ekman started as a journalist as well as a short story writer in Stockholms Fria Tidning and Brand magazine, where she wrote on Julia Kristeva, smoking bans and Jean-Paul Sartre among other topics.

She rose to fame with her Stockholm depictions in Dagens Nyheter's Stockholm section På Stan where she penned humouristic accounts on night life in Stockholm.

From 2006-2018, Ekman was a literary critic at the culture pages of Dagens Nyheter where she reviewed fiction and non-fiction. When Peruvian author Mario Vargas Llosa received the Nobel Prize in Literature, Ekman analysed his writings stating that he was "excellent at writing about men, but poor in writing about women, since his female characters are either whores or virgins."

She also wrote political commentary for the Stockholm newspapers Stockholm City where she argued for the Left against rightwing pundit PM Nilsson. In 2017, she became the economic columnist at Stockholm newspaper Metro. She then explained: "A lot of people think economics are complicated. But it is one of the easiest topics. I will take the time that the average Joe might not have, to immerse myself in studies and reports in order to explain how the economy works and who benefits."

From 2018 to the present, she has been a literary critic at the culture section of the Swedish daily Aftonbladet's cultural section.

She has also been an economics commentator at the TV station EFN Economics Channel.

In 2023, Ekman founded Parabol Press, an "intellectual monthly magazine" together with Swedish authors Nina Björk, Arne Ruth and Aleksa Lundberg. She currently serves as its editor-in-chief. She also writes op-eds about foreign policy for the Norwegian newspaper Klassekampen, and is a political op ed writer at Dala-Demokraten. She has also contributed to Le Monde diplomatique and Truthdig.

She has previously worked as an editorial writer for left wing paper Dagens ETC and was a member of the editorial board for the magazine Brand.

In August 2022, Ekman was appointed acting editor-in-chief of the syndicalist magazine Arbetaren during the sick leave of its regular editor. Ekman's appointment, made by the newspaper company's CEO without prior consultation with the board, prompted internal controversy within SAC Syndikalisterna. Following protests from staff and union members, the central committee intervened to dismiss the CEO and moved to terminate her contract. In September, Ekman stated that she had not received a formal termination notice and was continuing to work at the office despite being locked out of her email. She was let go shortly afterwards, but rehired after a court case ruled in her favour.

=== Article on Högdalen swimming pool ===
In 2010, Ekman put up the bathtub of the Municipal commissioner for Sports, Regina Kevius, for sale on the online marketplace Blocket in protest against the commissioner's privatization of the public swimming pool in Högdalen, Stockholm. The ad was removed by Blocket because the bathtub did not belong to the advertiser. Ekman argued that by the same logic, Kevius also had no right to sell the swimming pool, as it belonged to the people. The inspiration came from activists in Gothenburg who put up local politicians' homes for sale on online realtor site Hemnet after the city started selling properties from the public housing stock. Ekman followed up by posting books that she guessed the chairman of the municipal board in Nacka was reading since he put the operation of libraries out for tender.

=== Articles on illegal adoptions ===
In 2018, Ekman revealed in an article in Aftonbladet that children had been stolen from China for adoption when politician Ulf Kristersson had a tenure as chairman of the Swedish Adoption Center. He has since become the leader of the Moderate Party and further on Prime Minister of Sweden. Over thirty children were placed from orphanages involved in human trafficking. The article was followed up by a report in Dagens Nyheter in 2022, which showed that Kristersson was aware of the suspicions. Ekman expressed surprise that no investigating journalists had picked up the story.

=== Articles on Israel and Palestine ===
Ekman has written extensively about Palestine. She argues that Israel as a state is "built on occupation, the displacement of people, and apartheid" and that this should be criticized. She has argued for a one-state solution where all citizens of Israel/Palestine would have equal rights. She has described Israel as a dual system: US imperialism and Israeli settler-colonialism at the same atime, and argued against the notion that Israel controls the US, stating instead that the US controls Israel.

=== Labor market ===
In several articles, Ekman has written about the class society and the growing social disparities. She has criticized, among other things, why work-related accidents involving workers do not receive any attention in the media, as in this article from 2020: "There are no online threads where hobby detectives try to figure out what happened. It doesn't become a political issue where parties try to outdo each other in who does the most. And companies are almost never prosecuted for causing the deaths of workers. It's as if the whole of Sweden silently accepts that our country should be built at the expense of sacrificing workers, especially Eastern Europeans."

=== Investigative journalism ===
Ekman has investigated organised crime in Sweden and its ties to the political and capitalist class. In the article Jan Emanuels affärer she uncovered Swedish businessman Jan Emanuel's business deals where he received large sums to take care of refugees, while in reality running understaffed care homes where crime was rampant and pocketing the money. The article was also published in the EU Observer.

=== Arbetarbloggen ===
In 2022, Ekman founded the worker's blog Arbetarbloggen where workers from different sectors blog about their everyday work experience. She is the editor-in-chief, and anyone can contribute to the blog with the option to remain anonymous. The blog is not intended to report on misconduct or serve as another platform for political debate. One of the points is that workers spend a significant part of their lives at work, but it is rarely mentioned on social media or other interaction creating a lack of knowledge about each other's everyday experiences. As of 2026, the blog has 40 bloggers, from metal workers to hairdressers.

== Books ==
Ekman made her debut as an author in 2010 with Being and Being Bought, subtitled "Prostitution, Surrogacy and the Split Self". In the book, she argues that both prostitution and surrogacy are products of a neoliberal ideology that treats the human body as a commodity separate from the individual. She alleges that both practices amount to exploitation exacerbated by global inequalities, stating: "Thailand becomes a supplier of women for sex. India becomes a supplier of women for children." (Thailand blir en leverantör av kvinnor för sex. Indien blir en leverantör av kvinnor för barn.) Maria Sveland described it as "one of the year's most important books" (en av årets viktigaste böcker) in Dagens Nyheter. Therese Eriksson gave it a more critical review in Upsala Nya Tidning; while largely praising Ekman's discussion of postmodern discourse and victimhood, she also felt the work was overtly one-sided. While writing that the book contained some strong critiques, she also concluded it did not do enough to clarify Ekman's own philosophy and that its long-term impact would be limited by this ideologic narrowness. Both Sveland and Eriksson found Ekman's argument against so-called altruistic surrogacy (such as when a woman agrees to be a surrogate for a friend without expectation of payment) less convincing. Being and Being Bought has been translated into English, German, Spanish, French and Italian. Ekman's stance against surrogacy sparked debate. The ensuing debate led the Left Party and Feminist Initiative to take stances against surrogacy in Sweden.

Ekman's book Skulden: Eurokrisen sedd från Aten (approximately "The Debt: Eurocrisis perceived from Athens"), from 2014, explores the Euro area crisis and Greek government-debt crisis from a Greek perspective. The book was published in Greek under the title κλεμμένη άνοιξη (approximately "The Stolen Spring"). It challenges the myth of the lazy Greek often cited in Sweden and the rest of EU. Skulden was reviewed in Sweden's major daily Dagens Nyheter by Andres Lokko, who stated that "Kajsa Ekis Ekman is efficient and pedagogical. Even for a reader lacking even the most basic knowledge on economics, she clarifies the chain of events from threats of bankruptcy to the EU-banks (especially the German ones) egotist and arrogant decision-making about the future of Greece." The book was translated to Greek under the title Klemmeni Anoixi by Kedros Publications. For this book, Ekman was awarded the 2015 Swedish-Greek of the Year Prize.

In an interview to the Greek news site Greek News Agency, Ekman said: "What angered people was rather how they were depicted in the European press. The worst was the German press and Bild in particular. But Swedish media also spread a light version of the "Greek freak show" talking about hospitals with 50 gardeners and no garden, workers retiring at 40 and having luxury lives, and our biggest newspapers wrote that Greeks "took it easy under olive trees and drank coffee all day." I have been doing investigative journalism for 13 years but to debunk this myth took me 15 minutes. Just looking at statistics from Eurostat, ILO, OECD and others showed that Greeks actually work more hours than the average European. Productivity is lower, that is true, but this depends rather on the nature of the Greek industry which is not so technologically advanced as the central or northern European heavy industry. This has nothing to do with the workers themselves!.... The troika program has been an economic catastrophe and a human disaster for Greece."

Ekman's book On the Meaning of Sex: Thoughts about the New Definition of Woman, which addresses what she refers to as the new understanding of gender, was published in April 2021 and translated into Spanish and English.

She has argued that the perception of gender has shifted from being biological to being experiential, and that this risks undermining the issue of women's rights. Transgender individuals are mentioned in her book Being and Being Bought (2010), but it was first in the latter part of the 2010s that Ekman picked up the conflicts she believes exist between women's rights issues and later transgender rights demands. In an article from 2018, Ekman writes that gender has been redefined from being a reproductive function to constituting an identity. In addition to addressing ethical questions related to medical treatment of minors, the article discusses existing and potential negative effects of the new definition of gender. She expressed a surprise that the shift of paradigm she saw had not been discussed.

She argues that one kind of gender roles has been replaced by another. Where one was previously expected to dress in a certain way, have certain interests, and exhibit certain personality traits based on one's physical sex, now the physical sex is supposed to be determined by how one dresses, what interests one has, and what personality traits one exhibits.

Ekman's writings have been described in a cross-European study as part of an anti-gender backlash against transgender people in Sweden, with the book evoking many reactions and divided opinions. Swedish feminists such as Nina Björk and Yvonne Hirdman gave the book positive reviews. Among those who distance themselves from Ekman's stance is RFSL, a Swedish national organisation working for LBGT-rights, which responded to Ekman's book by publishing a list of a hundred things they believed were wrong in Ekman's book. The book also faced sharp criticism in daily and evening press for some of its conclusions and use of sources. The book was criticized for relying on far-right "fake news sources" and depicting trans women as a threat. Morgenbladet described the book's rhetoric as "abhorrent" and said that "it is debatable whether this book deserves any discussion at all." Maria Horvei wrote that Ekman's "onesided" book argues against strawmen.

A study in 2025 at Södertörn university (in Sweden) contradicted the claim that Kajsa Ekis Ekman should be described as an anti-gender activist. Ekman is mentioned as the author of a book on gender roles, but she is not mentioned at all under the subheading anti-gender actors in Sweden.

== Political activism ==
Ekman has founded several networks and organizations, including the climate action group Klimax, the anti-surrogacy network Feministiskt Nej till Surrogatmödraskap and Greece support network Nätverket för Grekland. In 2010, she was a spokesperson for the group Shut It Down aimed at the fossil fueled powerplant Värtaverket using acts of civil disobedience.

In the summer of 2015, she participated as an activist aboard one of the ships in the Ship to Gaza campaign to protest against Israel's blockade of Gaza. The ship was overtaken by the Israeli military, and she was subsequently detained for a week in Giv'on Prison in Ramla.

== Lectures ==
Ekman has lectured worldwide about prostitution and surrogacy. She was one of the speakers at the 2014 Sydney Festival of Dangerous Ideas where her talk was titled "Surrogacy Is Baby Trade". She was invited to the German Psychologists' Conference on Trauma and Prostitution in 2024 and spoke at the French National assembly in 2016 alongside José Bové.

Ekman has given a TEDx talk on capitalism in Athens. In her speech, she explains that she sees the past thirty years as a right-wing offensive, where capitalists have sought to recover the lost profits of the oil crisis through three strategies. First, by privatizing and infiltrating the welfare sector, second, by engaging in banking and speculative activities to a greater extent, and third, by lowering wages and/or relocating to low-wage countries. In the Swedish Television program Idévärlden in 2017, she states that capitalism is anarchistic by nature.

During the Gaza Genocide, Ekman has lectured across Sweden on imperialism, for example at the Swedish Church's Teo Talks. In the talk, she argues that US imperialism "starts with economic pressure using the IMF and the WTO, moves on to sanctions, to try to bring the population to its knees and make them blame its own government, and if that doesn't work, they invade militarily."

In 2020 Ekman lectured at the Swedish launch of Women's Declaration International (WDI; formerly named Women's Human Rights Campaign or WHRC). She has also participated in other WDI events, such as WDI's "Feminist Question Time." In 2022 she participated in a UK event focused on surrogacy.

On several occasions, Ekman has been canceled from speaking engagements. For example, she was canceled by national women's shelter organisation ROKS in 2018 with the reasoning that her statements about gender are "incompatible with Roks' ideology".

== Editorial board at Dagens ETC ==
Swedish left-wing magazine and publisher ETC started a daily newspaper, Dagens ETC, in 2014. It was a print publication with a clear left-wing profile and Ekman was contracted as an freelance writer of the editorials. Her contract was terminated with immediate effect in April 2022 after she wrote an article about the Ukrainian newspaper The Kyiv Independent, in the wake of the Russian invasion of Ukraine 2022. Ekman's article is an investigative report on the economic and political interests that influence the Ukrainian newspaper. The article focuses on the newspaper's financing, which Ekman argues comes from the European Endowment for Democracy and the Canadian government. The article also addresses the connections between the CEO and the defense reporter of the newspaper with the Ukrainian militia Azov Brigade, particularly highlighting their links to nazism, as well as the affiliations of many of the reporters with the U.S. Department of State and USAID.

The article was accused of reproducing Russian propaganda, casting suspicion on Ukraine, and praising Putin. Specific criticism was directed at Ekman for choosing this topic during an ongoing war. ETC decided to end its collaboration with Ekman, who was also accused of plagiarism since a similar article had been published before hers. However, Andreas Gustavsson, the editor-in-chief of ETC, had already reviewed Ekman's article prior to its publication and was able to refute the plagiarism allegations. He also clarified that the article was not the reason for ending the collaboration but rather Ekis' behavior on social media. On Instagram, Ekman had compared Kremlin controlled channel Russia Today with Telesur, Al Jazeera, and CNN. Gustavsson was accused of inability to recognize Russian propaganda, despite several articles with similar messages to Ekman's being published in close proximity to her article.

ETC's actions were questioned from various quarters, and a debate on freedom of speech and press freedom ensued. Several writers at ETC, including Nina Björk, Aleksa Lundberg, and Stefan Sundström, have expressed their support for Ekman's position as an opinion columnist, including through an open letter published in ETC and signed by twelve colleagues who write for ETC.

== Awards ==
- 2010 – Robespierre Prize
- 2015 – Swedish-Greek of the Year, appointed by "Nämnden för kulturellt samarbete mellan Sverige och Grekland", an Governmental board för cultural cooperation between Sweden and Greece.
- 2016 – Sara Lidman Award
- 2020 – Lenin Award

== Books ==
- Being and Being Bought: Prostitution, Surrogacy and the Split Self (Varat och varan : prostitution, surrogatmödraskap och den delade människan. Stockholm: Leopard. 2010) ISBN 978-91-7343-272-6
- Skulden : eurokrisen sedd från Aten. Stockholm: Leopard. 2013 ISBN 978-9173434065
- Texter 1998–2015. Perspektiv; 1. Stockholm: ETC Förlag. 2015 ISBN 978-91-7118-930-1
- On the Meaning of Sex: Thoughts about the New Definition of Woman (Om könets existens – tankar om den nya synen på kön. Stockholm: Polaris, 2021) ISBN 9789177954552
