= Amateur (album) =

Studio album by Molly Nilsson
- Released: 1 October 2025
- Recorded: 2022–2025
- Studio: Lighthouse Studios, Berlin
- Genre: Synth-pop; electropop; synthwave
- Length: 43:20
- Label: Dark Skies Association; Night School
- Producer: Molly Nilsson

Molly Nilsson chronology
Un-American Activities (2024)	Amateur (2025)

Singles from Amateur
- 1. "How Much Is the World" Released: 15 July 2025; 2. "Swedish Nightmare" Released: 29 August 2025; 3. "Get a Life" Released: 30 September 2025; 4. "Joe Hill's Last Will" Released: 19 November 2025

Amateur is the eleventh (Note: Amateur, Nilsson’s eleventh album, has erroneously been referred to as her twelfth album, including in the press release of her label Night School Records. This error can likely be traced back to Imaginations, her seventh album, falsely being referred to as her eighth album in the press release (although the following album, 2020, was then correctly referred to as her eighth album in the press release, too).) studio album by Swedish singer-songwriter Molly Nilsson, released on 1 October 2025.

== Background ==
The album’s press release refers to the origin of the word amateur being the Latin amator 'one who loves' (derived from Latin amare 'to love'), while in English, over time, it “developed a meaning related to a lack of professional skill or experience”.

Nilsson gave the following explanation of the album's title:

How did a word derived from love become a slur? [...] I see “amateurism” as a delighted, even foolish, protest. Protest against everything. Of what’s expected of someone, or expected of someone to desire or strive for. To be elite, to be expert, to be professional, to be a master, to excel and succeed. Where’s the joy in that? I just want to have fun. I want to want. I want to love. And keep doing it, forever.

== Production ==
The album was recorded in Nilsson's home studio in Berlin. She started working on Amateur shortly after the release of her ninth album Extreme (2022) but paused production for nine months to make another album, Un-American Activities (2024).

According to Nilsson, the life and works of Swedish-American labor activist and songwriter Joe Hill inspired her while making Amateur. Initially, she wanted to publish the album on his birthday (October 7), but ultimately decided against it due to the October 7 attacks also having taken place on that date. Nilsson has stated that the album is "still, in a way, dedicated to him".

== Musical style ==
Several writers have highlighted the album’s diverse sound and genre influences.

"Swedish Nightmare" has been described as a "wistful dance-pop track" and as resembling "90s dream pop". "Get a Life" has been called punk by several writers, with one stating it "goes full art-punk". "How Much Is the World" has been referred to as "sunny synth-pop", with another writer saying that "if one listens closely [to the song] – one could even detect some schlager". "Valhalla" has been likened to baroque pop, whereas "Joe Hill's Last Will" has been said to have an "almost liturgical chant". “Classified”, meanwhile, has been classified as “immersive house” and as a “piano house tune”, with one writer adding that it is reminiscent of “80s Madonna”.

== Critical reception ==
Professional ratings
Review scores
Source	Rating
AllMusic	3.5/5 stars
Dagens Nyheter	4/5 stars
Laut.de	4/5 stars
Le Devoir	3.5/5 stars
Mindies	8/10
Mondo Sonoro	7/10

Amateur received positive reviews. In a positive review for The Fader, David Renshaw calls the album "some of Nilsson’s most joyful music to date", declaring it an "effective, and convincing, remedy for pessimistic minds".

Kerstin Kratochwill of German online magazine Laut.de gave Amateur a positive review, highlighting "How Much Is the World" as a standout track. She further called the album "captivating" and described it, regarding its sound, as "one of her most diverse records". Christopher Hunold, in his review for German HHV Mag, states that Nilsson's music is still "unmatched in its hymnic lo-fi wave pop", further remarking that, for her music, "the political aspect is as important as the personal" by now.

Amateur was listed by HighClouds as one of the 47 best releases (EP, album, or mixtape) of 2025. Spanish-language publication Mindies ranked Amateur 56th on its list of the best international releases of 2025. Roddy Woomble, lead vocalist of Scottish indie rock band Idlewild, named Amateur as his tenth favorite album of 2025, explaining that Nilsson "writes great pop songs" that "all sound like hits to [him]". He added that "[she's] like the underground Madonna".

== Track listing ==
All tracks are written by Molly Nilsson.

Amateur track listing
No.	Title	Length
1.	"Die Cry Lie"	3:55
2.	"Valhalla"	2:30
3.	"Swedish Nightmare"	3:39
4.	"Classified"	2:40
5.	"Long Time No See"	2:23
6.	"Fatal Distraction"	1:53
7.	"Get a Life"	3:29
8.	"Joe Hill's Last Will"	1:33
9.	"How Much Is the World"	5:40
10.	"Creeping Beauty"	4:26
11.	"All the Way"	3:09
12.	"Big Life"	4:04
13.	"The Bitter End"	3:51
Total length:		43:20
