= Un-American Activities =

Studio album by Molly Nilsson
- Released: 7 July 2024
- Recorded: January–March 2024
- Studio: Villa Aurora, California
- Genre: Synth-pop
- Length: 30:24
- Label: Dark Skies Association; Night School
- Producer: Molly Nilsson

Molly Nilsson chronology
Extreme (2022)	Un-American Activities (2024)	Amateur (2025)

Singles from Un-American Activities
- 1. "Palestine (Somewhere over the Rainbow)" Released: 18 May 2024; 2. "Excalibur" Released: 18 June 2024; 3. "The Communist Party" Released: 3 July 2024; 4. "The Beauty of the Duty" Released: 11 July 2024; 5. "Naming Names" Released: 12 October 2024

Un-American Activities is the tenth (Note: Un-American Activities, Nilsson’s tenth album, has erroneously been referred to as her eleventh album, including in the press release of her label Night School Records. This error can likely be traced back to Imaginations, her seventh album, falsely being referred to as her eighth album in the press release (although the following album, 2020, was then correctly referred to as her eighth album in the press release, too).) studio album by Swedish singer-songwriter Molly Nilsson, released on 7 July 2024.

== Production ==
The album was produced in Villa Aurora, the former home of Lion Feuchtwanger and his wife Maria, as part of an artist residency that ran from January to March 2024. It is Nilsson's first album where the cover artwork is not in black and white.

== Themes ==
The album has been described as Nilsson's "most nakedly political record yet", with one writer stating that the album is "to be understood as a communist manifesto".

== Critical reception ==
Professional ratings
Review scores
Source	Rating
Indienauta	8/10
Le Devoir	4/5 stars
Mindies	8.5/10
Mondo Sonoro	6/10

In a positive review for The Washington Post, Chris Richards named Un-American Activities as "[the] most underrated pop album" of the summer of 2024. The album's song "The Communist Party" was ranked 44th on The Fader's list of the 50 best songs of 2024.

== Track listing ==
All tracks are written by Molly Nilsson.

Un-American Activities track listing
No.	Title	Length
1.	"Prologue: Proud Destiny"	1:02
2.	"Excalibur"	3:09
3.	"Palestine (Somewhere over the Rainbow)"	3:52
4.	"Jackboots Return"	3:07
5.	"Wetcheeks"	2:42
6.	"Red Telephone"	5:00
7.	"Naming Names"	2:35
8.	"The Communist Party"	2:21
9.	"The Beauty of the Duty"	2:40
10.	"Point Doom"	3:49
Total length:		30:24
