= Follow the Light =

Follow the Light may refer to:

- Follow the Light (Bad Boys Blue album), 1999
- Follow the Light (Molly Nilsson album), 2010

== See also ==
- Follow the Lights, an EP by Ryan Adams and The Cardinals
