= Ma Cheng =

Ma Cheng may refer to:

- Ma Cheng (Junqian) (馬成), style name Junqian (君遷), Eastern Han Dynasty general in the Book of the Later Han
- Ma Cheng (footballer) (馬成), footballer for Wuhan Optics Valley F.C.
- Ma Cheng (马𩧢), a woman from Beijing who, due to her obscure name, frequently encounters issues regarding name registration in places such as airports and police stations
