= Dagens ETC =

Left-leaning Swedish newspaper.

- Type: Daily newspaper
- Format: Tabloid
- Owner: ETC Media AB
- Editor: Andreas Gustavsson
- Founded: January 2014; 12 years ago
- Political alignment: Left-wing
- Language: Swedish
- Headquarters: Stockholm, Sweden
- Readership: 120,000 daily
- ISSN: 1652-8980
- Website: Official website

Dagens ETC is a Swedish daily newspaper with a left-wing and environmental profile. It is published by ETC Media and is based in Stockholm.

The newspaper was launched in January 2014. It contains domestic and international news and has a particular focus on issues including gender equality and climate change.

The newspaper has been associated with a number of Swedish writers and journalists, including Göran Greider and Kajsa Ekis Ekman.

== History ==
Dagens ETC was launched in January 2014 as a daily newspaper.

Dagens ETC has an explicitly feminist profile and has tracked the representation of women and men in its pages.

In 2019, the newspaper decided to stop accepting advertising from fossil-fuel companies.

== Circulation and reach ==
The Swedish Media Authority's report on the Swedish news market places ETC Media — the company that publishes Dagens ETC — among the larger companies within the group of small national news-media companies.

According to ETC's own figures, Dagens ETC reached approximately one million readers per month in 2024.

In 2021, ETC reported that Dagens ETC reached approximately 120,000 people per day across its print edition, website and app.

Dagens ETC markets itself to readers it describes as politically engaged opinion-formers and decision-makers in culture, media and politics.

Dagens ETC's reporting is regularly discussed by other major Swedish media outlets. For example, Aftonbladet's editorial page discussed a Dagens ETC investigation into Swedish media coverage of the Gaza war, citing its findings and responding to its conclusions.

Sveriges Radio covered the launch of Dagens ETC in 2014 and discussed its prospects as a new Swedish daily newspaper.

Dagens ETC is also included in academic research on Swedish news consumption. A 2025 study in Mass Communication and Society classified Dagens ETC among Sweden's left-wing alternative news outlets and included it in an analysis of news use alongside major Swedish newspapers and broadcasters.

== See also ==
- ETC (magazine)
- List of newspapers in Sweden
