= These Things Take Time =

These Things Take Time may refer to:

- These Things Take Time (SubArachnoid Space album), 2000
- These Things Take Time (Molly Nilsson album), 2008
- These Things Take Time, a song by The Smiths from Hatful of Hollow
