= Sólo Paraíso =

EP by Molly Nilsson
- Released: 28 July 2014
- Recorded: Summer 2014
- Venue: Buenos Aires, Argentina
- Genre: Synth-pop
- Length: 25:16
- Label: Dark Skies Association; Night School
- Producer: Molly Nilsson

Molly Nilsson chronology
The Travels (2013)	Sólo Paraíso (2014)	Zenith (2015)

Singles from Sólo Paraíso
- 1. "Summer Cats" Released: 28 March 2014; 2. "Blue Dollar" Released: 15 May 2014; 3. "Plaza Italia" Released: 24 July 2014

Sólo Paraíso (subtitled The Summer Songs EP) is the debut extended play by Swedish singer-songwriter Molly Nilsson, released on 28 July 2014.

== Production ==
For the production of Sólo Paraíso, Nilsson "took a step out of her comfort zone recording-wise", as it was written and recorded during a two-month stay in Buenos Aires in the summer of 2014. Nilsson explained: "I have a real following there and somehow, I managed to land a two-month residency, which was ideal. I needed to work somewhere that was totally unlike Berlin."

As of 2023, Sólo Paraíso remains Nilsson's only release that was not recorded in her home studio in Berlin.

== Release ==
The extended play was exclusively released on vinyl on 28 July 2014. Unlike Nilsson's other releases, it is not available as a digital download or on streaming platforms, as of 2023.

== Critical reception ==
Professional ratings
Review scores
Source	Rating
Norman Records	4/5 stars

Loud and Quiet writer Joe Goggins referred to Sólo Paraíso as a "faultless EP" in his review of Nilsson's later Zenith. The staff reviewer writing for Norman Records "[h]eartily recommended" the release, while praising Nilsson's "impressively earthy, deep vocal delivery" and songwriting.

== Track listing ==
All tracks are written by Molly Nilsson.

Sólo Paraíso track listing
No.	Title	Length
1.	"Summer Cats"	3:10
2.	"Perfect Past"	3:36
3.	"Punks in Paradise"	3:04
4.	"Plaza Italia"	3:35
5.	"Blue Dollar"	3:10
6.	"Maximo Says"	3:19
7.	"Bar Roma"	2:05
8.	"Malaysian Airlines"	3:17
Total length:		25:16
