= Lenin Award (Sweden) =

Swedish cultural award

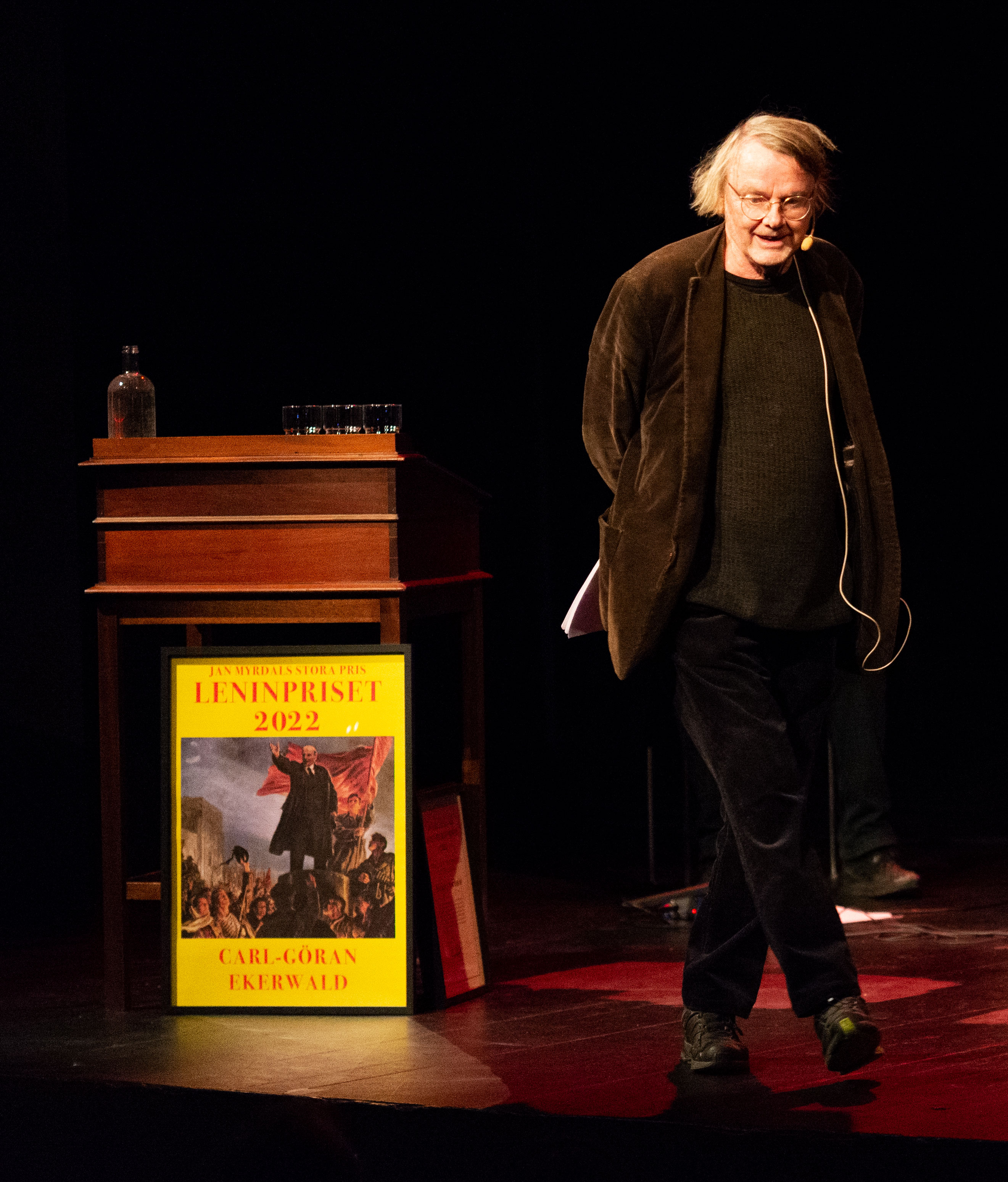
- Lasse Diding at the 2022 award ceremony.
- Location: Varberg
- Country: Sweden
- Presented by: Lasse Diding
- Reward: 100,000 SEK (11655.01 USD)
- First award: 2009
- Website: leninpriset.se

Jan Myrdal’s big prize – The Lenin Award is a Swedish cultural award that is awarded annually by Lasse Diding to a writer or artist in Sweden who operates with social criticism and in a rebellious leftist tradition. In 2016, the award was called the Jan Myrdal Library's big prize – the Lenin Award and in 2017–2021 the award was just called the Lenin Award.

== Background ==
With its 100,000 SEK, the award is one of Sweden's largest literary awards. The award winner, who can be nominated by anyone and until 2017 was chosen by the board of the Jan Myrdal Society, should, when the Jan Myrdal Society gave out the award, be a Swedish "writer or artist working in Jan Myrdal's critical and rebellious tradition". This tradition was called "refractory" by the Jan Myrdal Society.

The award was instituted in connection with the founding of the Jan Myrdal Society in 2008, on the initiative of, among others, the entrepreneur Lasse Diding before Jan Myrdal's and Andrea Gaytan Vegas's wedding. The original name of the award was "Jan Myrdal's big prize - the Lenin Award".

During the period 2016–2018, the Jan Myrdal Society carried out a change of its statutes with the aim of separating the award from the person of Jan Myrdal and from the Jan Myrdal Society. As a first step, the award was referred to as "the Jan Myrdal Library's big prize – the Lenin Award" in 2016 at Jan Myrdal's request. In 2017, the award was referred to solely as "the Lenin Award". This change took several years to finish, as two AGM resolutions are required to amend the statutes of the Jan Myrdal Society. In 2022 the award was once again called Jan Myrdal's big prize – the Lenin Award after an agreement between Lasse Diding and Jan Myrdal before the latter's death in 2020.

The choice to name the award after Vladimir Lenin has been controversial; among others, Peter Englund has criticized the choice of name on his blog. In 2013, author Susanna Alakoski declined the award because she did not want to be associated with "totalitarian ideologies or regimes". In the same year, the award and the 2013 laureate Maj Sjöwall were criticized by Carl Bildt.

== Laureates ==
=== Jan Myrdal's big prize – the Lenin Award ===
In 2016, the award was called the Jan Myrdal Library's big prize – the Lenin Award and in 2017–2021 the award was just called the Lenin Award.

- 2009 – Mattias Gardell, author and historian
- 2010 – Roy Andersson, film director
- 2011 – Maj Wechselmann, documentary filmmaker
- 2012 – Sven Lindqvist, author
- 2013 – Maj Sjöwall, author and screenwriter
- 2014 – Jan Guillou, journalist and author
- 2015 – Mikael Wiehe, musician and lyricist
- 2016 – Mikael Nyberg, author and editor
- 2017 – Stefan Jarl, film director
- 2018 – Sven Wollter, actor and author
- 2019 – Göran Therborn, professor and Marxist sociologist
- 2020 – Kajsa Ekis Ekman, journalist and author
- 2021 – Nina Björk, journalist, literary scholar and author
- 2022 – Carl-Göran Ekerwald, author and translator
- 2023 – Karl Ove Knausgård, author
- 2024 – Martin Hägglund, philosopher and scholar of modernist literature
- 2025 – Andreas Malm, author and human ecologist
- 2026 – Dror Feiler, musician, artist and activist

== See also ==
- The Robespierre Prize
- Vladimir Lenin
