= The Travels (album) =

Studio album by Molly Nilsson
- Released: 21 June 2013
- Studio: Lighthouse Studios, Berlin
- Genre: Synth-pop
- Length: 46:19
- Label: Dark Skies Association; Night School
- Producer: Molly Nilsson

Molly Nilsson chronology
History (2011)	The Travels (2013)	Sólo Paraíso (2014)

Singles from The Travels
- 1. "Dear Life" Released: 23 May 2013; 2. "Going Places" Released: 2 October 2013; 3. "Atlantic Tales" Released: 31 October 2013; 4. "The Power Ballad" Released: 13 December 2013; 5. "Ten New Lives" Released: 6 May 2016

The Travels is the fifth studio album by Swedish singer-songwriter Molly Nilsson, released on 21 June 2013. It was the first of her albums to be co-released by Night School Records in addition to her own label Dark Skies Association.

== Release ==
The Travels was released on vinyl, CD, cassette tape, and as a digital download on 21 June 2013. A release party for the album was held at Berghain nightclub on 19 June 2013.

== Critical reception ==
Professional ratings
Review scores
Source	Rating
Éclat	4/5 stars
Mondo Sonoro	8/10
Norman Records	3.5/5 stars
OndaRock	7/10
Peek-a-boo	9/10

The Travels received positive reviews. Clinton, in a positive review for Norman Records, called the album a "darkly enjoyable record", humorously adding that it sometimes sounds like "early ‘80s drug-ravaged, grumpy-as-hell Nico being forced to work with the Pet Shop Boys". Luis J. Menéndez of Spanish magazine Mondo Sonoro also compared Nilsson's voice and its "expressive monotony" to that of Nico.

Pascal Verloove, in a highly positive review for Peek-a-boo Magazine, called the album "beautiful" and praised its interplay of Nilsson's "melancholic voice", "disillusioned lyrics" and "catchy beats". Marlena Julia Dorniak, in a positive review for German Éclat Magazin, praised Nilsson's relatable lyrics, "melancholic, simple instrumentation", and "captivating, dreamy voice". Roberto Rizzo of Italian magazine OndaRock called The Travels a "pulsating, heartfelt album" and named "The Power Ballad" as a standout song.

== Track listing ==
All tracks are written by Molly Nilsson.

The Travels track listing
No.	Title	Length
1.	"Worlds Apart"	4:24
2.	"Philadelphia"	3:44
3.	"Dirty Fingers"	3:23
4.	"The Power Ballad"	3:18
5.	"Atlantic Tales"	4:41
6.	"Omega"	4:20
7.	"Dear Life"	4:14
8.	"Going Places"	3:55
9.	"City"	2:06
10.	"Ten New Lives"	4:18
11.	"Kumla"	3:47
12.	"Out There"	4:24
Total length:		46:19
