= Robespierre Prize =

- Location: Varberg
- Country: Sweden
- Presented by: Lasse Diding
- Reward: 25,000 SEK
- First award: 2010
- Website: leninpriset.se

The Robespierre Prize is a Swedish cultural award, which is given out annually since 2010 and is funded by Lasse Diding. The prize rewards a younger Swedish writer or artist who works in a critical spirit. In the years 2010–2017, the award winner was chosen by the Jan Myrdal Society. In 2010–2015, the Robespierre Prize was called "Jan Myrdal's small prize – the Robespierre Prize".

The Robespierre Prize, which is worth SEK 25,000, would, when the Jan Myrdal Society selected the laureate, award a young, promising writer or artist who worked in Jan Myrdal's critical spirit. The prize money was SEK 10,000 in 2010–2021 and was raised to SEK 25,000 with the 2022 prize to Aleksej Sachnin.

The Robespierre Prize is given out simultaneously with the Lenin Award.

In 2013, that year's laureate Gabriela Pichler was criticized in the major Swedish newspaper Dagens Nyheter for accepting an award named after Robespierre. When the award went to Sápmi Sisters in 2016, the duo refused to accept because they considered Jan Myrdal to be homophobic.

During the period 2016–2018, the Jan Myrdal Society implemented a statutory change with the aim of separating the award from the person of Jan Myrdal and from the Jan Myrdal Society. As a first step, the award was referred to as “Jan Myrdal Library's small prize – the Robespierre Prize” in 2016 at Jan Myrdal's request. In 2017, the award was referred to solely as the "Robespierre Award". This change took several years to finish, as two AGM resolutions are required to amend the statutes of the Jan Myrdal Society.

== Laureates ==
- 2010 – Kajsa Ekis Ekman
- 2011 – Martin Schibbye
- 2012 – Jenny Wrangborg
- 2013 – Gabriela Pichler
- 2014 – Eija Hetekivi Olsson
- 2015 – Sara Beischer
- 2016 – Sápmi Sisters
- 2017 – Anna Roxvall
- 2018 – Henrik Bromander
- 2019 – Daria Bogdanska
- 2020 – David Ritschard
- 2021 – Kalle Holmqvist
- 2022 – Aleksej Sachnin
- 2023 – Amanda Werne
- 2024 – Fanny Klang
- 2025 – Andi Olluri
- 2026 – Molly Nilsson

== See also ==
- The Lenin Award (Sweden)
- Maximilien de Robespierre
