= History (Molly Nilsson album) =

Studio album by Molly Nilsson
- Released: 14 December 2011
- Recorded: 2010–2011
- Studio: Lighthouse Studios, Berlin
- Genre: Synth-pop
- Length: 41:55
- Label: Dark Skies Association
- Producer: Molly Nilsson

Molly Nilsson chronology
| Follow the Light (2010) | History (2011) | The Travels (2013) |

Singles from History
- 1. "Skybound" Released: 21 October 2011; 2. "Hotel Home" Released: 2 December 2011; 3. "Intermezzo: The Party" Released: 30 April 2012; 4. "In Real Life" Released: 3 September 2012; 5. "I Hope You Die" Released: 19 September 2012

History is the fourth studio album by Swedish singer-songwriter Molly Nilsson, released on 14 December 2011. It was Nilsson's final album to be entirely self-released, as she started collaborating with Night School Records afterwards. History has been cited as Nilsson's "breakout" album, including by herself.

== Background ==
Regarding the album's concept and title, Nilsson explained:

Each song tells a story, and together they form a narrative. [No one's] life weighs more than another, yet not everyone ends up in the history books. I took this opportunity to feel what it's like to hold the pen that writes history.

== Release ==
History was originally self-released through Nilsson's own label Dark Skies Association. The CD version was released on 14 December 2011 and the vinyl version followed in April 2012. In association with Night School Records, History was then released as a digital download on 31 January 2019, while reissues of the CD and vinyl versions followed on 29 March 2019. It was again reissued on vinyl on 29 September 2023.

== Critical reception ==
Professional ratings
Review scores
| Source | Rating |
|---|---|
| AllMusic | 3.5/5 stars |
| Éclat | 4/5 stars |
| Pitchfork | 7/10 |

History received positive reviews. Emilie Friedlander of Pitchfork, in a positive review, said that the album is "carried by the commanding, almost Nico-like ominousness of [Nilsson's] voice". Tim Sendra, writing for AllMusic, praised Nilsson's "wonderfully idiosyncratic music" and noted its emotional impact. In a positive review for German Éclat magazine, Marlena Julia Dorniak described Nilsson's music as "morbid", "melancholic", and "magical".

"I Hope You Die" was positively highlighted as a standout song by several writers. Friedlander noted that it demonstrates the "over-the-topness of Nilsson's aesthetic most forcefully". Sendra praised it for its "heartbreakingly honest" lyrics, while Dorniak commended its combination of a "danceable beat" with "tragically romantic" lyrics. The song also quickly became a "fan favorite".

== Track listing ==
All tracks are written by Molly Nilsson.

History track listing
| No. | Title | Length |
|---|---|---|
| 1. | "In Real Life" | 4:06 |
| 2. | "You Always Hurt the One You Love" | 3:01 |
| 3. | "I Hope You Die" | 4:28 |
| 4. | "The Bottles of Tomorrow" | 2:03 |
| 5. | "Hiroshima Street" | 3:51 |
| 6. | "Intermezzo: The Party" | 2:55 |
| 7. | "Hotel Home" | 4:49 |
| 8. | "City of Atlantis" | 3:41 |
| 9. | "QWERTY (Censored Version)" | 4:35 |
| 10. | "The Clocks" | 3:31 |
| 11. | "Skybound" | 4:38 |
| Total length: | | 41:55 |
