= Molly Nilsson =

Swedish singer-songwriter (born 1984)

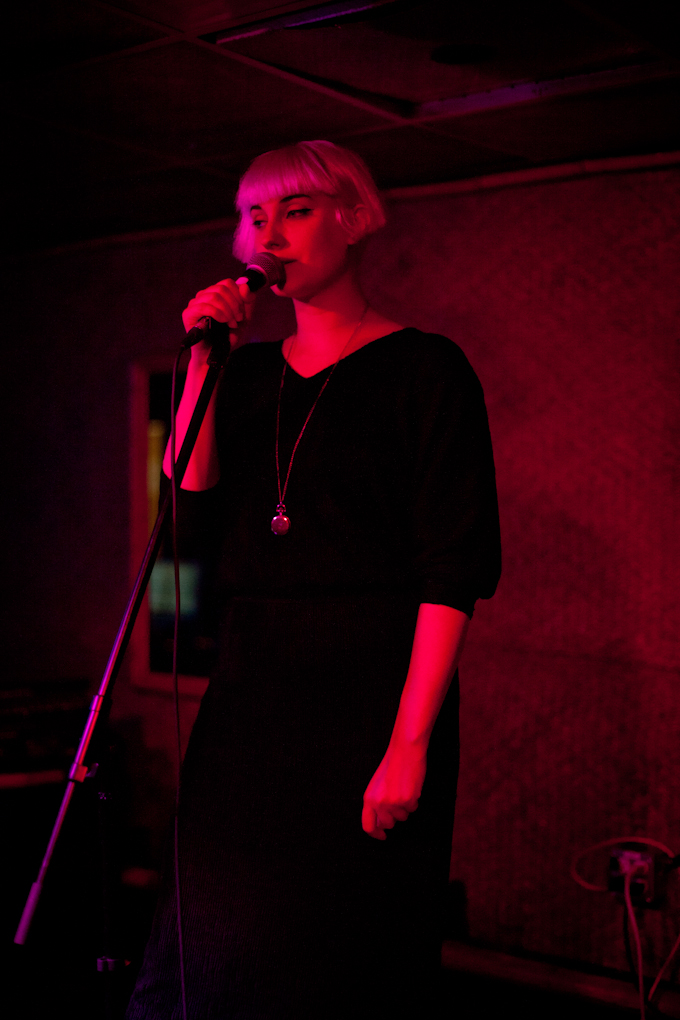
- Nilsson in 2012

Background information
- Born: 14 December 1984 (age 41); Stockholm, Sweden
- Genres: Synth-pop; electronic; minimal synth; hypnagogic pop
- Occupations: singer; songwriter; musician
- Years active: 2007–present

Molly Lilly Maria Nilsson (born 14 December 1984) is a Swedish singer-songwriter and musician. She is the owner of an independent record label, Dark Skies Association, founded in 2009. As of 2004, Nilsson resides in Berlin.

== Early life ==
Nilsson is from Stockholm; she was born in Gröndal and grew up in Södermalm, in a non-musical family. Both of her parents were communists. She has described her father, a graphic designer, as her "biggest fan".

In school, Nilsson had some piano lessons and a punk rock band with friends, where they "played a little bit", but mostly "just hung out". Growing up, she listened to a lot of 1970s punk from the United Kingdom. As a teenager, she sometimes worked as a DJ.

She began her creative pursuits in comics and writing. Soon she began experimenting with a friend's keyboard and transitioned from visual media into songwriting.

== Music ==
Nilsson moved to Berlin to pursue music. She worked in the cloakroom of Berlin nightclub Berghain, while saving money to write songs on weekdays. She released her first album in 2008 titled These Things Take Time, which she released on CD-R with just 500 copies. In 2009, she released another self-produced album, Europa. Nilsson gained more visibility in 2011 when her song "Hey Moon" from These Things Take Time, was covered by John Maus for his album We Must Become the Pitiless Censors of Ourselves. After releasing another album, Zenith, in 2015, Nilsson began a world tour. In early 2021, after Maus appeared in the crowd at the Donald Trump rally prior to the January 6th attack on the U.S. Capitol, Nilsson would re-release "Hey Moon" along with the song "Silver" as a double-sided single to benefit Black Lives Matter.

Nilsson produces and performs her music on her own, though she co-releases much of her music on Dark Skies Association and Glasgow's Night School Records. Nilsson's style features minimalist arrangements of synthesizers and drum beats and is often categorized as dark pop or lo-fi synth-pop. She cites solitude as a necessary and important part of her creative process. During live performances, Nilsson often sings over a CD of her own work.

One of Nilsson's heroes is Polish socialist Rosa Luxemburg, the subject of Nilsson's song "Obnoxiously Talented". In an interview with Tribune magazine, she said: "[A]part from her work and legacy, I've really developed a relationship with Rosa Luxemburg on a human level. It's great to find people in history who can give you an example of what's possible, or how you can live your life, or what you should strive for." Nilsson's album Extreme (2022), was released on the date of Luxemburg's death, 15 January.

== Discography ==
=== Studio albums ===
- These Things Take Time (2008)
- Europa (2009)
- Follow the Light (2010)
- History (2011)
- The Travels (2013)
- Zenith (2015)
- Imaginations (2017)
- 2020 (2018)
- Extreme (2022)
- Un-American Activities (2024)
- Amateur (2025)

=== Extended plays ===
- Sólo Paraíso (2014)

=== Singles ===
- "Ugly Girl" / "Wrong Boy" (2016)
- "About Somebody" / "Quit (In Time)" (2017)
- "Hey Moon" / "Silver" (2021 – charity re-release for Black Lives Matter)

== Awards ==
- 2026 – Robespierre Prize
