= Europa (Molly Nilsson album) =

Studio album by Molly Nilsson
- Released: 17 June 2009
- Recorded: 2009
- Studio: Lighthouse Studios, Berlin
- Genre: Synth-pop
- Length: 36:29
- Label: Dark Skies Association
- Producer: Molly Nilsson

Molly Nilsson chronology
These Things Take Time (2008)	Europa (2009)	Follow the Light (2010)

Singles from Europa
- 1. "Europa" Released: 9 June 2009

Europa is the second studio album by Swedish singer-songwriter Molly Nilsson, released on 17 June 2009.

== Background and themes ==
The album marked the formation of Nilsson's self-run label Dark Skies Association. The flag of Europe is used as the logo of the label. In an interview, Nilsson said the following about Europe and the EU:

The idea of the EU – and by that I mean a unified and peaceful Europe and not some of the political realities – is something beautiful, visionary. The simple message of working together instead of fighting each other in competition or warfare.

Europa was conceived against the backdrop of the Great Recession and the then-incoming 2010s decade. The album has been described as idealistic, hopeful, and dealing with the ideas of "having no borders to imprison people" and "people coming together to make things better".

== Production ==
Europa was written and recorded in 2009. Nilsson described the album's production as "kind of difficult". It was the first of her releases to be recorded in her own Lighthouse Studios in Berlin.

The song "Berlin, Berlin" is notable for being in Nilsson's native Swedish, as opposed to her usual English. She has not written any songs in Swedish since.

== Release and reception ==
Europa was originally self-released through Nilsson's label Dark Skies Association on CD and vinyl on 17 June 2009. It was her first release on vinyl, and it marked the formation of her self-run label. The album did not sell as well as she had expected.

The album was released as a digital download on 12 March 2021. A reissue on both CD and vinyl followed in April 2021, co-released by Night School Records. For its 2021 reissue, the album was remastered by James Plotkin. Europa was the last of Nilsson's entirely self-released albums to be reissued on Night School Records. As of 2021, 25% of the album's profits are said to be donated to Sea-Watch.

Looking back at the album in 2022, Nilsson gave a mixed opinion, calling it a "transitional record" and a "middle child" between These Things Take Time and Follow the Light, while noting that there are "some songs" on Europa that she loves.

== Promotion ==
A music video for the title track "Europa" was released on 9 June 2009.

== Track listing ==
All tracks are written by Molly Nilsson.

Europa track listing
No.	Title	Length
1.	"In the Mood for a Tattoo"	3:04
2.	"The Revenge of the Stalker"	3:20
3.	"More Certain Than Death"	4:18
4.	"When I Have No Words"	3:00
5.	"Berlin, Berlin"	3:18
6.	"Europa"	1:16
7.	"I Whisper in My Ear"	4:06
8.	"The Crisis"	2:02
9.	"Asleep in Stockholm"	4:28
Total length:		36:29
