= Under det rosa täcket =

1996 book by Nina Björk

Under det rosa täcket (English: Under the Pink Duvet) is a Swedish feminist book written by Nina Björk, first published in 1996. The book made a great impact on the Swedish feminist field of the 1990s and is notable for introducing Butlerian queer theory to Sweden.
