= Extreme (Molly Nilsson album) =

Studio album by Molly Nilsson
- Released: 15 January 2022
- Recorded: 2019–2020
- Studio: Lighthouse Studios, Berlin
- Genre: Synth-pop
- Length: 41:31
- Label: Dark Skies Association; Night School
- Producer: Molly Nilsson

Molly Nilsson chronology
| 2020 (2018) | Extreme (2022) | Un-American Activities (2024) |

Singles from Extreme
- 1. "Absolute Power" Released: 12 October 2021; 2. "Pompeii" Released: 22 November 2021; 3. "Sweet Smell of Success" Released: 13 January 2022; 4. "Obnoxiously Talented" Released: 25 April 2022

Extreme is the ninth (Note: Extreme, Nilsson’s ninth album, has erroneously been referred to as her tenth album, including in the press release of her label Night School Records. This error can likely be traced back to Imaginations, her seventh album, falsely being referred to as her eighth album in the press release (although the following album, 2020, was then correctly referred to as her eighth album in the press release, too).) studio album by Swedish singer-songwriter Molly Nilsson, released on 15 January 2022.

== Background ==
Regarding the album's title, Nilsson gave the following explanation:

I was thinking about the title Extreme right after I'd made Twenty Twenty. At the time, I just thought that it was kind of a fun title—a good working title to [remind myself to] be playful and not hold myself back. It turned into thinking of 'extremes' in this black-and-white, polarized society, and the struggles between all the different sides and all these different ways of thinking.

== Production ==
After the release of her previous album 2020, Nilsson went through a period of "creative depression". Extreme was then "largely written" in 2019 and "mainly recorded" in 2020.

== Themes ==
Power has been noted as the central topic on Extreme. In the album's promotional material, label Night School Records wrote: "It's a record about power. About how to fight it, how to take it and how to share it."

== Promotion ==
"Absolute Power" was released as the album's first single on 12 October 2021, along with a music video. "Pompeii" was released as the album's second music video on 22 November 2021.

== Release ==
The album was released on vinyl, CD, and as a digital download.

== Critical reception ==
Professional ratings
Review scores
| Source | Rating |
|---|---|
| AllMusic | 4/5 stars |
| Crack | 7/10 |
| Loud and Quiet | 6/10 |
| Mindies | 8.6/10 |
| Musikexpress | 5/6 stars |
| Norman Records | 4/5 stars |
| Spectrum Culture | 7.5/10 |

Extreme received critical acclaim. In a positive review, Tim Sendra of AllMusic called Extreme "both Nilsson's most interesting album and a striking reboot", citing her experimentation with "new moods" and "new genres". Jana-Maria Mayer of German Musikexpress characterized the album as a "romantic indictment of the Anthropocene" and praised Nilsson's songwriting.

Sophia McDonald of Loud and Quiet, in a mixed-to-positive review, considered Extreme "an LP that is generally surprising in its trajectory" and noted its "nostalgic fun", but criticized it for a lack of "closeness" and "intimacy" to Nilsson in comparison with earlier works.

The closing track "Pompeii" was highlighted by Raphael Helfand of The Fader as a "happy-sad classic" that serves as a "rallying cry for resilience in the face of impossible odds". The track was also praised by German Musikexpress.

Extreme was ranked by The Fader as the 10th best album of 2022.

== Track listing ==
All tracks are written by Molly Nilsson.

Extreme track listing
| No. | Title | Length |
|---|---|---|
| 1. | "Absolute Power" | 3:49 |
| 2. | "Earth Girls" | 4:11 |
| 3. | "Fearless Like a Child" | 4:02 |
| 4. | "Kids Today" | 4:04 |
| 5. | "Intermezzo: The Wheel of Fortune" | 3:36 |
| 6. | "Sweet Smell of Success" | 4:20 |
| 7. | "Obnoxiously Talented" | 3:38 |
| 8. | "Avoid Heaven" | 3:37 |
| 9. | "Take Me to Your Leader" | 3:01 |
| 10. | "They Will Pay" | 2:42 |
| 11. | "Pompeii" | 4:31 |
| Total length: | | 41:31 |
