= Zenith (Molly Nilsson album) =

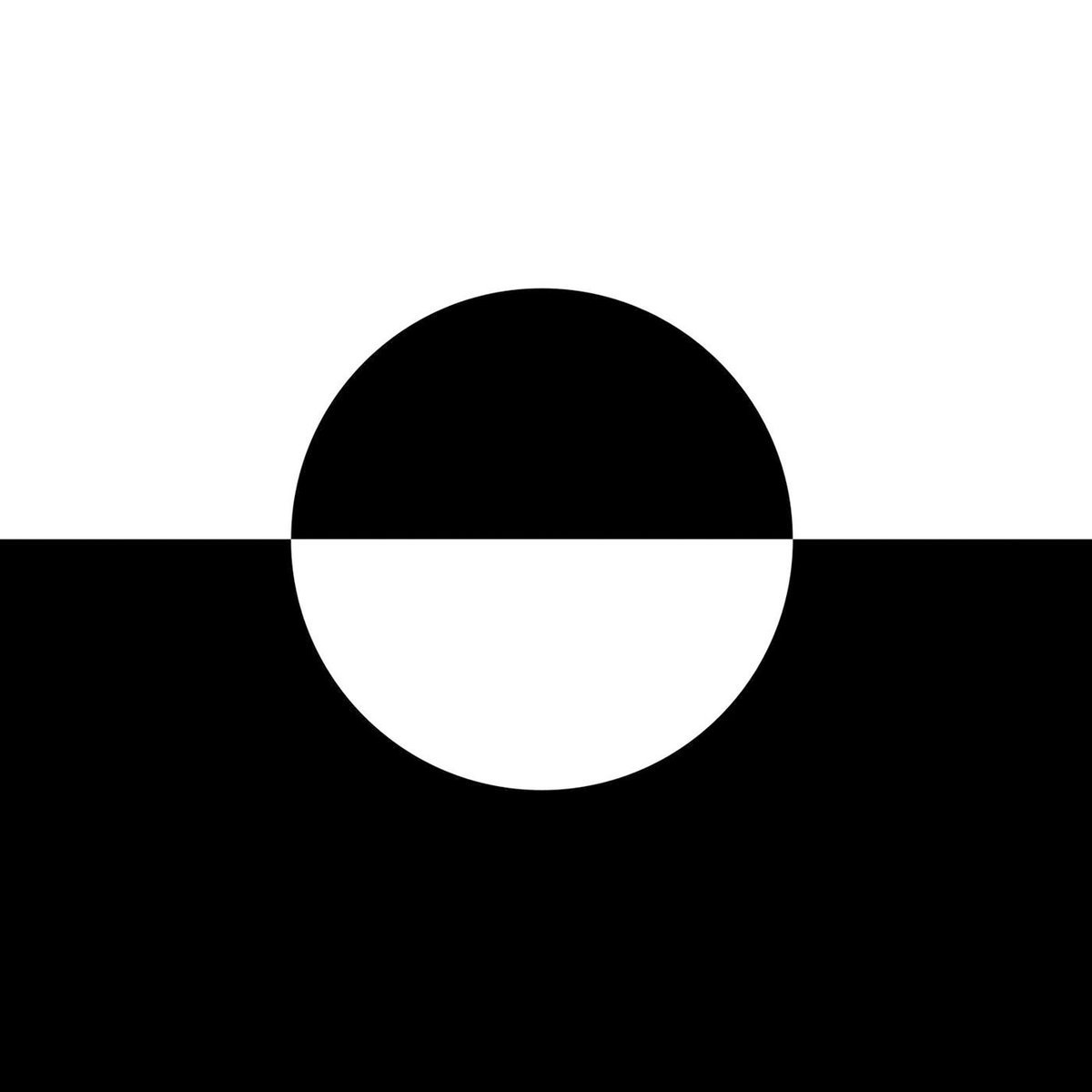

Studio album by Molly Nilsson
- Released: 6 November 2015
- Recorded: 2014–2015
- Studio: Lighthouse Studios, Berlin
- Genre: Synth-pop
- Length: 47:05
- Label: Dark Skies Association; Night School
- Producer: Molly Nilsson

Molly Nilsson chronology
Sólo Paraíso (2014)	Zenith (2015)	Imaginations (2017)

Singles from Zenith
- 1. "Lovers Are Losers" Released: 30 July 2015; 2. "1995" Released: 18 August 2015; 3. "Mountain Time" Released: 4 September 2015; 4. "Happyness" Released: 15 October 2015; 5. "My Body" Released: 6 November 2015

Zenith is the sixth studio album by Swedish singer-songwriter Molly Nilsson, released on 6 November 2015.

== Background ==
Nilsson considered several titles for the album before eventually settling on Zenith. Regarding the title, she stated: "I like [the album] as a peak, but not in the sense that whatever comes before or after is not a peak – I wanted it to be like an eternal peak."

== Production ==
Nilsson had finished one iteration of the album in January 2015, but after a two-month holiday, she realized that she "had to make a new album". She then finished the second and final version of the album in June 2015, explaining that she "needed that sunlight in the album". Nilsson estimates that the final version is "probably 75% new".

Regarding the equipment used for the album's production, Nilsson stated: "The keyboard I made Zenith with, I found on eBay, costs 25 euros and is really shitty. [...] It took me a while until I got to know it and then I figured out how to make the best of it."

== Release ==
Zenith was released on vinyl, CD, and as a digital download on 6 November 2015. It was originally scheduled to be released on 25 September 2015, but it was delayed.

== Critical reception ==
Professional ratings
Review scores
Source	Rating
AllMusic	4/5 stars
Éclat	3.5/5 stars
Loud and Quiet	6/10
Mondo Sonoro	7/10
Norman Records	4/5 stars
TN2 Magazine	4/5 stars

Zenith received positive reviews. Tim Sendra, writing for AllMusic, called Zenith a "landmark album" and "not too far from [genius]", while noting its wider appeal when compared with previous albums. Finnán Tobin, in his review for TN2 Magazine, stated that the album "feels so heartfelt that one cannot help but be enamoured" and pointed out the song "Bunny Club" as the "definite album highlight". He further noted the "juxtaposition" of the "somewhat upbeat" music and Nilsson's "world-weary lyricism".

Joe Goggins of Loud and Quiet called Zenith "a pleasingly cohesive piece of work", but criticized that it "feels a little bit less adventurous than what we’ve grown accustomed to from Nilsson". Jonas Kiss, writing for Austrian magazine Skug, praised the song "1995", but criticized the album's production for being "too smooth" in comparison with Nilsson's prior works.

== Use in media ==
"Happyness" was used in the fourth episode of the fourth series of the British drama Industry, "1000 Yoots, 1 Marilyn", as background music for the finale of Henry Muck (Kit Harington)'s presentation of the newly rebranded Tender banking app.

== Track listing ==
All tracks are written by Molly Nilsson.

Zenith track listing
No.	Title	Length
1.	"The Only Planet"	4:32
2.	"1995"	4:41
3.	"H.O.P.E."	3:35
4.	"Mountain Time"	4:30
5.	"Bunny Club"	3:07
6.	"Intermezzo: Palimpsest Galore"	3:46
7.	"Happyness"	4:06
8.	"Lovers Are Losers"	3:29
9.	"Clearblue"	3:38
10.	"My Body"	4:13
11.	"Titanic"	1:37
12.	"Bus 194 (All There Is)"	1:45
13.	"Tomorrow"	4:04
Total length:		47:05
