= Naming law in Sweden =

Swedish law

The naming law in Sweden (Swedish: lag om personnamn, alternately namnlagen) is a Swedish law which requires the approval of the government agency for names to be given to Swedish children. The parents must submit the proposed name of a child within three months of birth. The current law was enacted in 2017, replacing a 1982 law. The Swedish Tax Agency administers the registration of names in Sweden. The law has been revised since originally enacted; in 1983, it was made possible for a man to adopt his wife's or partner's name, as well as for a woman to adopt her husband's name.

The 2017 law states, in part: "First names shall not be approved if they can lead to discomfort for the person bearing the name, or for any other reason is unsuitable as a name" (§ 28). This text applies both when parents name their children and when an adult wants to change their own name. Unlike the 1982 law, the 2017 law gives the Swedish Tax Agency the ability to charge a fee for requesting to change your name. The law states nothing about registering which name is used on a daily basis, but the tax authority can register that if requested.

== History ==
The first real national legislation on family names was the Name Ordinance of 5 December 1901, primarily meant to prevent non-noble families from giving their children the names of noble families. The Ordinance was revised in 1919, 1920, 1921, 1922, 1931, 1946 and 1962. The Ordinance was followed by the Names Act of 1963, which went into full legal effect on 1 January 1964. This was followed by the Names Act of 1982 (Swedish: Namnlagen).

== Middle name ==
Until 2017, the law in Sweden allowed a person to take the family name of their spouse after marriage, while also keeping their previous family name. The first of these two family names was, according to the law, called a "middle name" (mellannamn in Swedish). Due to misunderstandings about what a "middle name"/"mellannamn" was (for example, when buying flight tickets), in 2017 the naming law dropped the term "middle name"/"mellannamn" and instead called this "double family name" (dubbelt efternamn in Swedish).

== Protest names ==
There has been some controversy surrounding Sweden's naming laws since their enactment. Aside from significant commentary in the press, many parents have attempted to give their children unusual names.

=== Brfxxccxxmnpcccclllmmnprxvclmnckssqlbb11116 ===
Brfxxccxxmnpcccclllmmnprxvclmnckssqlbb11116, ostensibly pronounced [ˈǎlːbɪn] ("Albin"), was a name intended for a Swedish child born in 1991. Parents Elisabeth Hallin and Lasse Diding gave their child this name to protest a fine, imposed in accordance with the naming law in Sweden.

Because the parents had failed to register a name by the boy's fifth birthday, a district court in Halmstad, southern Sweden, fined them 5,000 kronor (roughly US$740 at the time and equivalent to $1,519 in 2025). Responding to the fine, the parents submitted the 43-character name in May 1996, claiming that it was "a pregnant, expressionistic development that we see as an artistic creation". The parents suggested that the name be understood in the spirit of 'pataphysics. The court rejected the name and upheld the fine.

==== A ====
The parents then tried to change the spelling of the name to A (also pronounced [ˈǎlːbɪn]). Once again, the court refused to approve of the name due to a prohibition of one-letter names. However, the Supreme Administrative Court later ruled in 2009 that one-letter names are allowed.

=== Metallica ===
In 2007, Michael and Karolina Tomaro fought to have their daughter named "Metallica", after the band. Tax officials determined that the name was "inappropriate", but the Göteborg County Administrative Court ruled in March 2007 that there was no reason to block the name, stating that a Swedish woman already used the middle name Metallica. Tax officials did not agree with the decision and denied the parents a passport for their daughter, but later withdrew the objection.

Commentary at the time noted that the name "Google" was earlier deemed acceptable in 2005, when Elias and Carol Kai named their child "Oliver Google Kai".

=== Allah ===
In 2009, the Swedish Tax Authority refused to allow a couple to name their son "Allah". The basis of the decision was that the name could be seen as objectionable for religious reasons, and that some people might take offense at such a name.

As of 31 December 2018, 245 people living in Sweden had Allah as a forename, and three people in Sweden had Allah as a surname.

== See also ==
- Naming law – Legal restriction
- Naming laws in China
- Swedish nobility – Socially privileged class in Sweden
