= The Woman with the Handbag =

1985 photograph by Hans Runesson

Coordinates: 56°52′45.6″N 14°48′37.2″E

The photograph by Hans Runesson

The Woman with the Handbag (Swedish: Kvinnan med handväskan; also Tanten med handväskan, transl. The lady with the handbag) is a photograph taken in Växjö, Sweden on 13 April 1985 by photojournalist Hans Runesson. It depicts a 38-year-old woman, Danuta Danielsson, hitting a marching Neo-Nazi with a handbag.

According to scholar Samuel Merrill, the photograph became popular for three reasons: it captures what Henri Cartier-Bresson called the "decisive moment" of an action or composition, it anticipates and insinuates rather than explicitly demonstrates violence, and it depicts what seems to be a vulnerable older woman confronting a young archetypal Neo-Nazi skinhead.

== History ==
The photograph was taken during a small demonstration of the Nordic Realm Party supporters on 13 April 1985. As approved by the authorities, the rally had been planned to be held shortly after the end of a public speech delivered by the Left Party-Communists leader Lars Werner in the centre of Växjö, and skirmishes between left-wing supporters and Neo-Nazis began even before the start of the far-right demonstration.

Runesson's photograph was published the next day on the front page of the Swedish national newspaper Dagens Nyheter, and on 15 April by two British newspapers, The Times and The Daily Express. Another photograph taken by Runesson during the event shows the 10 Neo-Nazis being chased, pelted with eggs and violently confronted by a crowd made up of hundreds of attendants of the left-wing rally joined by local Växjö residents. One of the Neo-Nazis was kicked unconscious on the ground, then saved by one of the protestors who reportedly took pity on him. The far-right activists eventually managed to shelter in the toilets of the city's train station, hiding there for a few hours until the police transported them away.

The picture was selected as the Swedish Picture of the Year (Årets bild) 1985 and later as the Picture of the Century by the magazine Vi and the Photographic Historical Society of Sweden. The photograph was produced using gelatin silver process and editioned by gallerist Pelle Unger. Twelve copies, three AP and three PP have been produced in the size 58 by 80 centimetres (23 in × 31 in) and price ranges between €2,000 and €3,800 as of July 2020.

== Subjects of the photo ==
The woman in the photo, Danuta Danielsson (née Seń), was born in March 1947 in Gorzów Wielkopolski, Poland. She came from a Polish family whose roots were in a small village in southeastern Poland, in the region of Lublin. After World War II, her family relocated to Gorzów Wielkopolski. She had three siblings. Her mother had survived a German concentration camp Majdanek in Poland. She met Björn "Beson" Danielsson at a jazz festival in Poland in 1981. They married in November of the same year in Gorzów, and the couple moved to Sweden in October 1982.

Danielsson chose to remain anonymous after the event, allegedly due to fears of criminal prosecution and Neo-Nazi reprisal. The initial press accounts about her life were often unreliable, and myths about her past accrued over the years as her name remained unknown to the public for nearly three decades. Although she was only 38 years old at the time of the event, Danielsson came to be seen in the public opinion as a personification of the tant ('old lady'), which in Swedish collective imagery symbolizes "mundane and unstated wisdom, civil courage and moral alignment". Danielsson had mental health issues, and she died three years after the event by suicide after jumping from Växjö's water tower in 1988.

The woman in the photograph was revealed to be Danielsson by the press in 2014, in the midst of debates over the installation of a statue as a public memorial of the confrontation. Her son condemned the idea and stated that Danielsson had never liked the photograph and regretted its fame. He also dispelled the rumours that she was herself a Jewish concentration camp survivor, or that she did not know what she was doing at the time of the event because of her mental health issues.

The man hit by Danielsson was identified as Seppo Seluska, a militant from the Nordic Realm Party later convicted for the torture and murder of a gay Jew.

== Statues ==
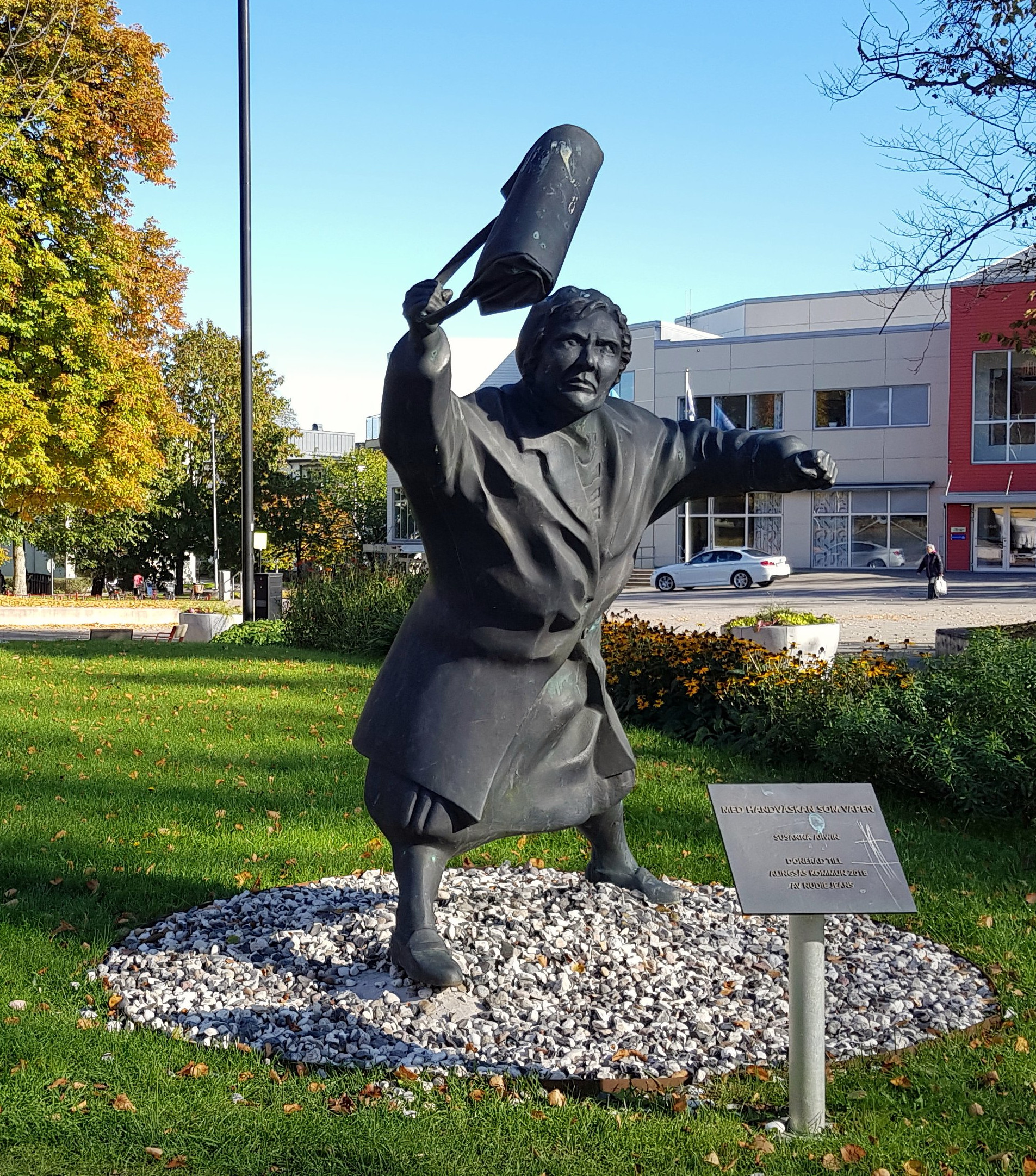
Med handväskan som vapen, Alingsås

A local artist, Susanna Arwin, expressed desire to raise a life-sized statue of Danielsson in Växjö, but it was decided against in February 2015 for two reasons: council members were concerned such a statue could be interpreted as promoting violence, and Danielsson's surviving family reported that they would be unhappy with Danielsson being memorialized in such a manner. To protest the decision, people across Sweden began adding handbags to statues.

In September 2015, Swedish hotel entrepreneur Lasse Diding announced he had bought the statue and intended to donate it to Varberg municipality. The statue was later unveiled at Varberg Fortress, but the Varberg board of culture voted in April 2016 not to accept the donation.

The statue is now in the garden of Diding's Villa Wäring in Varberg and a second statue has been unveiled in the town of Alingsås, titled Med handväskan som vapen (transl. With the handbag as a weapon).

== Bibliography ==
- Merrill, Samuel (2020). "Following The Woman with the Handbag: Mnemonic Context Collapse and the Anti-Fascist Activist Appropriation of an Iconic Historical Photograph". In Merrill, Samuel; Keightley, Emily; Daphi, Priska (eds.). Social Movements, Cultural Memory and Digital Media: Mobilising Mediated Remembrance. Springer Nature. ISBN 978-3-030-32827-6.
