= Göran Therborn =

Swedish sociologist

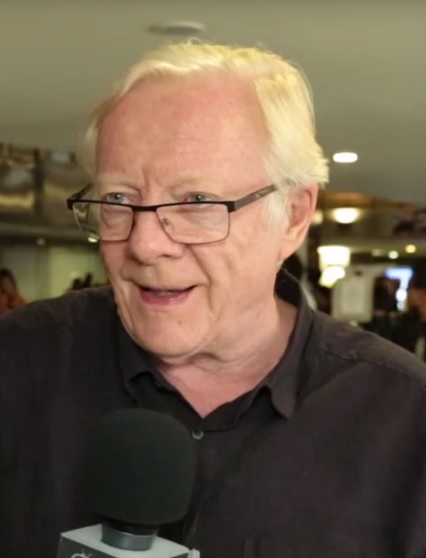
Göran Therborn in 2015

Göran Therborn FAcSS (23 September 1941, Kalmar, Sweden) is a professor of sociology at Cambridge University.

== Academic work ==
He has published widely in journals such as the New Left Review, and is notable for his writing on topics that fall within the general political and sociological framework of post-Marxism. Topics on which he has written extensively include the intersection between the class structure of society and the function of the state apparatus, the formation of ideology within subjects, and the future of the Marxist tradition.

== Education ==
Therborn was born in 1941 into a landowning family. He graduated from the gymnasium in Hanseatic Kalmar in 1960. He attended Lund University in Sweden, where he received a Fil. Dr. in 1974.

== Notable works ==
In his book The Ideology of Power and the Power of Ideology (1980) Therborn departs from Louis Althusser's writings on the formation of ideology by addressing ideological change, the ideological constitution of classes, and ideological domination. He develops a material matrix of ideologies, and a general outline of how ideologies are formed from a post-Marxist perspective.

From Marxism to Post Marxism? (2008), attempts to convey in a relatively small amount of space a comprehensive history of the development of Marxist theory and the trajectory of Marxist thought in the 21st century.

== Honours ==
Therborn was awarded the 2019 Lenin Award. In his acceptance speech, he said: "The Lenin Award is, by its name, an intentional provocation, not only against the bourgeoisie and the good stock market prices, but also against the silent, the cautious and timid, who sit still and patiently wait for what the government will come up with, such as for instance the January agreement this year, about which gaps to expand and what social rights should be cut back."

In the Fall of 1987, Therborn was a Residential Fellow at the Swedish Collegium for Advanced Study in Uppsala, Sweden.

== Bibliography ==
- Therborn, Göran (1976). Science, Class & Society. Verso. ISBN 0-86091-724-X.
- Therborn, Göran (May–June 1977). "The rule of capital and the rise of democracy". New Left Review. I (103). New Left Review: 3–41.
- Therborn, Göran (1978). What Does the Ruling Class do When it Rules?: State Apparatuses and State Power under Feudalism, Capitalism and Socialism. (Reprinted as Radical Thinkers Series, Verso (2008)
- Therborn, Göran (1980). The Ideology of Power and the Power of Ideology.(Reprinted as Verso Classic (1999)
- Therborn, Göran (1986). Why Some Peoples are More Unemployed than Others.
- Therborn, Göran (1995). European Modernity and Beyond: The Trajectory of European Societies, 1945-2000.
- Therborn, Göran (2004). Between Sex and Power: Family in the World, 1900-2000.
- Therborn, Göran (2008). From Marxism to Post-Marxism?.
- Therborn, Göran (2010). Handbook of European Societies: Social Transformations in the 21st Century. Springer. ISBN 9781441981288. Details.
- Therborn, Göran (2011). The World: A Beginner's Guide.
- Therborn, Göran (2013). The Killing Fields of Inequality.
- Therborn, Göran (2017). Cities of power.
- Therborn, Göran (2020). Inequality and the Labyrinths of Democracy. Verso. ISBN 9781788738996.
