= Lasse Diding =

Swedish hotelier, entrepreneur and writer

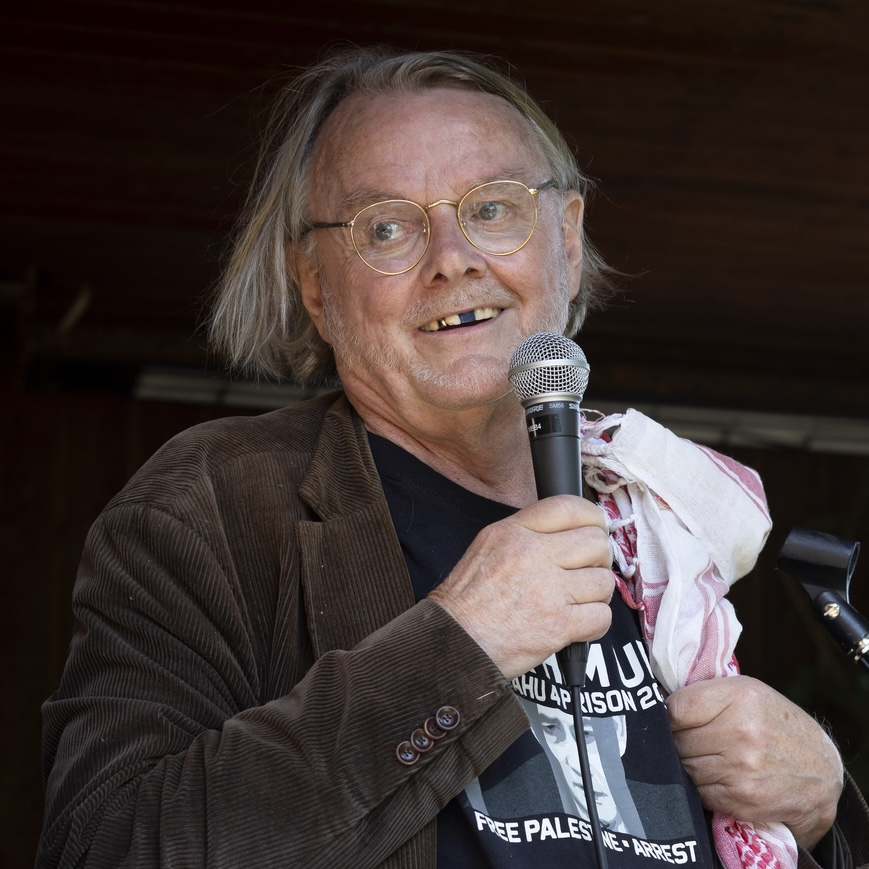
- Diding in 2025
- Born: Lars Gunnar Diding; 24 April 1953 (age 73); Varberg
- Occupations: Hotelier; entrepreneur; writer
- Spouse: Elisabeth Hallin
- Children: Albin Hallin
- Awards: "Entrepreneur of the year" in Varberg 2007

Lasse Gunnar Diding (born Lars Gunnar Diding; 24 April 1953) is a Swedish hotelier, entrepreneur and writer. He operated Hotell Gästis (1987–2018) and Hotell Havanna (2013–2018) in Varberg. In 2007, Diding was named Entrepreneur of the Year in Varberg. He is well-known in Sweden due to his frequent use of Vladimir Lenin in naming things: in addition to opening the Lenin Spa at Hotell Gästis and being the founder of the Lenin Award, Diding has proposed to name a football stadium and a public park in Varberg after Lenin. In 2017, he was a part of the documentary Revolution: 100 years young by the Russian television network RT. 1 January 2023, Lasse Diding opened Leninland in Varberg. The establishment welcomes writers in residence and claims to be a “cultural free zone for free-thinking writers and journalists on the left”.

== The Lenin Award and Jan Myrdal ==
Each year, Diding gives out the Lenin Award of 100,000 SEK to "an author or artist in Sweden, who operates with social criticism and in a rebellious leftist tradition" and the Robespierre Prize of 25,000 SEK to "a young Swedish writer or artist, who operates in a critical spirit". The awards originally also bore the name of Jan Myrdal and were given out by the Jan Myrdal Society, but since 2017 Diding is the only sponsor of the awards.

Diding was the founder of the Jan Myrdal Society in 2008 and later, in collaboration with Henning Mankell, made a building in Varberg available to house the large private library which Myrdal donated to the society. The Jan Myrdal Library was officially opened in 2015.

== With the handbag as a weapon ==
Diding bought Susanna Arwin's statue "With the handbag as a weapon" (based on the 1985 photo The Woman with the Handbag) in 2015 before donating it to Varberg Municipality the following year to be placed in Brunnsparken (the centre of Varberg). The statue was the centre of much dispute, and after extensive debate in the local press, the municipality decided not to accept the donation. Diding chose to donate the statue to the Halland Museum of Cultural History at Varberg Fortress instead and in September 2016, the Halland County Museum's Foundation unanimously decided to receive the statue. The statue is currently placed in the garden of Diding's Villa Wäring in Varberg, where passersby can view the artwork.

== Son name dispute ==
Diding tried to name his son "Brfxxccxxmnpcccclllmmnprxvclmnckssqlbb11116" (ostensibly pronounced Albin) but was denied at both the Tax Authority and when the case was brought to court. He and his partner, Elisabeth Hallin, decided not to register any official name for their son as an act of protest against the naming law, and did not do so until they were sentenced by the County Administrative Court in Halland County to pay a fine of SEK 5,000 after failing to register a name on the boy's fifth birthday. However, the long name was not approved by the authorities. They later wanted to spell the name "A" but keep the pronunciation, which was also denied by the authorities. Finally, they settled on naming the boy Albin as pronounced.

== See also ==
- Naming law in Sweden
