= Nina Björk =

Swedish writer

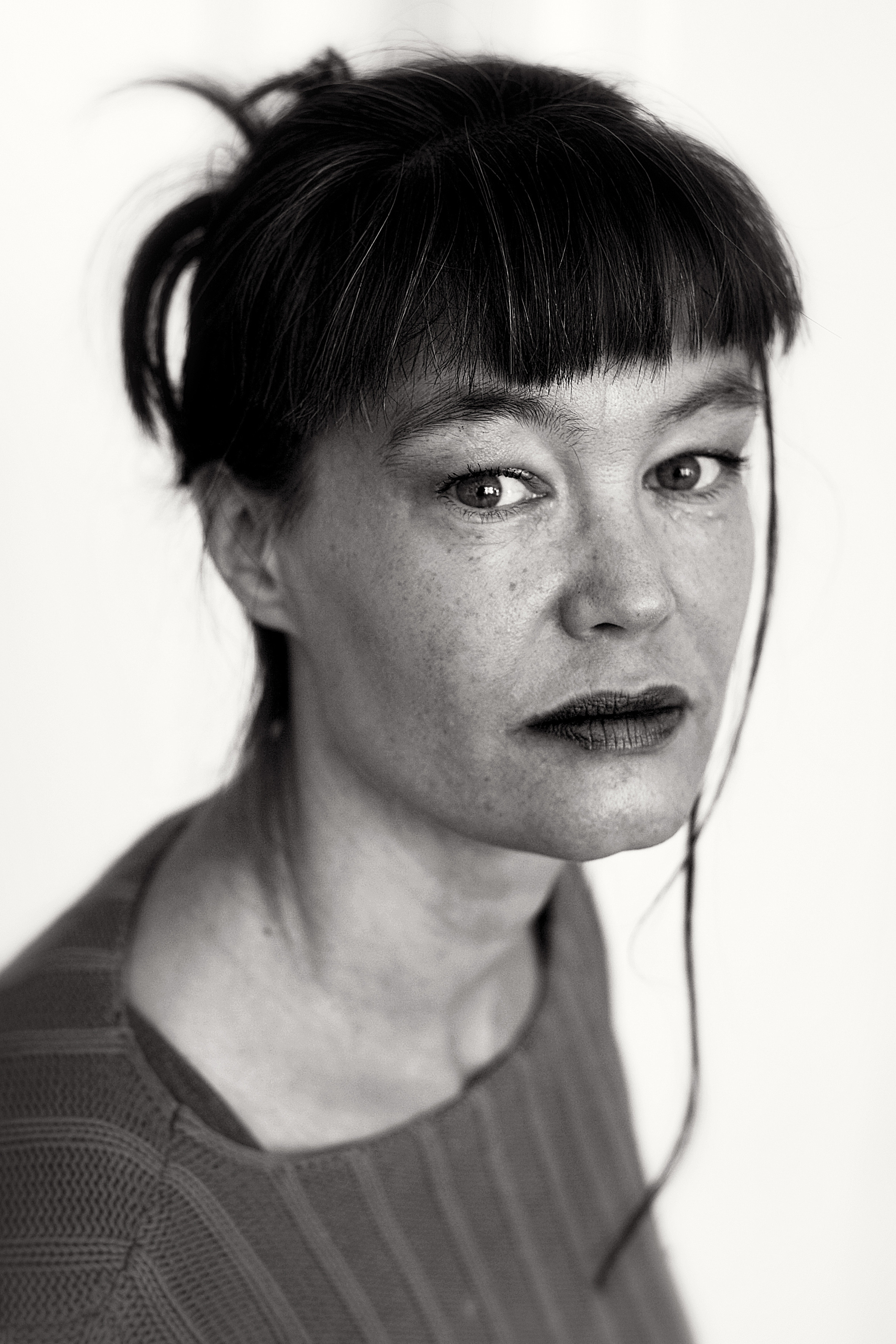
A portrait of Nina Björk, Swedish journalist and author.

Nina Björk (born May 18, 1967 in Östersund, Jämtland) is a Swedish writer and a feminist activist. She is most well known for Under det rosa täcket (Under the Pink Duvet), a feminist book written in 1996. She received her PhD in literary criticism from the University of Gothenburg in 2008 and has worked as a columnist for Dagens Nyheter.

She is known for her literary criticism, and her writings with several newspapers and political work. She has also voiced opposition to queer theory from a materialist perspective, having argued in 2018 that she "does not understand what trans people mean" and questioned the validity of gender identity as a concept. She has repeatedly portrayed the self identification and changing of the meaning of gender as a threat to feminism, and she has been described by Swedish commentators as part of a "trans-doubting" current within feminism. In 2025 she took part in the launch of a Swedish organization called Rättssäker, which seeks to restrict transgender healthcare.

She is considered to be a left-wing equity feminist. In 2008 she earned her PhD degree in literary criticism at University of Gothenburg with her doctorate thesis Fria Själar. She is also well known as a columnist in Dagens Nyheter.

She was awarded the Lenin Award (Sweden) in 2021.

== Personal life ==
Nina Björk has a husband and two adult children.

== Bibliography ==
- Under det rosa täcket, 1996, ISBN 91-46-17011-1
- Sireners sång, 1999, ISBN 91-46-17469-9
- Fria själar, 2008, ISBN 91-46-21927-7
- Lyckliga i alla sina dagar, 2012, ISBN 978-91-46-22210-1
- Drömmen om det röda : Rosa Luxemburg, socialism, språk och kärlek, 2016, ISBN 978-91-46-23059-5
- Om man älskar frihet: Tankar om det politiska, 2020,ISBN 9789146236801
