= These Things Take Time (Molly Nilsson album) =

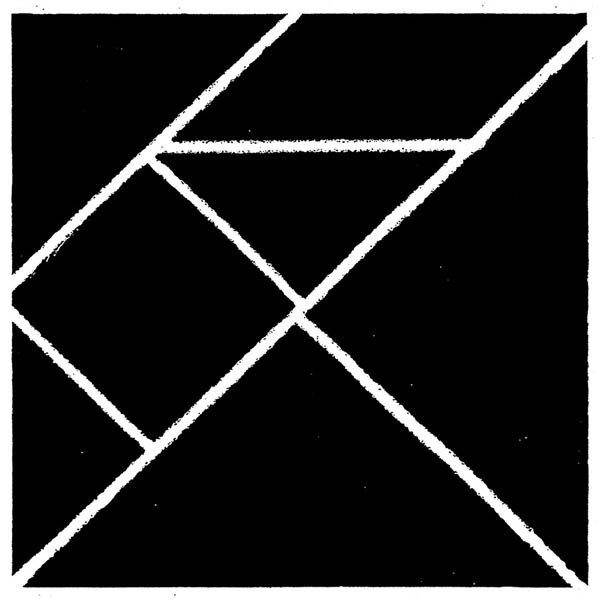

Studio album by Molly Nilsson
- Released: 13 September 2008
- Recorded: 2007–2008
- Genre: Synth-pop
- Length: 50:04
- Label: Dark Skies Association
- Producer: Molly Nilsson

Molly Nilsson chronology
These Things Take Time (2008)	Europa (2009)

Singles from These Things Take Time
- 1. "(Won't Somebody) Take Me Out Tonight" Released: 15 April 2008; 2. "Hey Moon!" Released: 18 April 2008; 3. "The Home Song" Released: 12 May 2008; 4. "The Diamond Song" Released: 18 August 2008; 5. "Dinosaur Tears" Released: 8 February 2009; 6. "The Lonely" Released: 8 February 2009; 7. "8000 Days" Released: 13 February 2009

These Things Take Time is the debut studio album by Swedish singer-songwriter Molly Nilsson, released on 13 September 2008.

== Background ==
Looking back at the album and its title in 2022, Nilsson explained:

I was saying, ‘Okay, patience. I want to make this love affair I have with music last a long time. I don’t want to burn out or you know, throw it up in the air and just see where it lands.’ So I think it was a very good starting point for me.

== Production ==
The album was produced by Nilsson with the keyboard of her then-roommate, with vocals being recorded on her laptop. According to Nilsson, the album's songs were written "over maybe a year’s time", but it was "[made up of] ideas that [she] had collected [her] whole life”.

== Themes ==
The album has been said to deal with "love, partying, and the passage of time".

== Release ==
The album was self-released by Nilsson. She burned it on CD by herself, with a run of 100 copies. In 2018, the album was reissued for Record Store Day. The album was again reissued on CD and vinyl on 30 October 2021.

== Reception ==
In 2013, Roberto Rizzo of Italian magazine Onda Rock cited These Things Take Time as one of the best albums of the preceding five years. Retrospectively, Ed Blair of Bandcamp Daily called it a "remarkably assured arrival", while citing songs "Whiskey Sour" and "Hey Moon!" as ongoing fan favorites.

== Track listing ==
All tracks are written by Molly Nilsson.

These Things Take Time track listing
No.	Title	Length
1.	"The Lonely"	3:38
2.	"The Diamond Song"	4:09
3.	"8000 Days"	3:26
4.	"Wounds Itch When They Heal"	2:16
5.	"Whiskey Sour"	4:30
6.	"Poisoned Candy"	3:54
7.	"(Won't Somebody) Take Me Out Tonight"	4:44
8.	"Hey Moon!"	5:24
9.	"The Home Song"	4:02
10.	"Joyride"	4:46
11.	"We're Never Coming Home"	3:49
12.	"Dinosaur Tears"	4:02
13.	"My Dream From Last Night"	1:34
Total length:		50:04
