= Naming laws in China =

Naming laws in the People's Republic of China (excluding Hong Kong and Macau) require names to be in Chinese characters and ban names the government considers to "exaggerate religious fervor". Although it is advised for parents to name their children so that others are able to easily read their names, there are no restrictions on the complexity of Chinese characters used, provided that there are no technical issues in doing so (see below). The use of simplified characters is advised over traditional Chinese characters; however, this is not strictly enforced.

== Details ==
"General Principles of Civil Law" Article 99 guarantees citizens the right to a name and the choice of naming therein. The right of self-naming permits the surname, although naturally obtained from the paternal side, to be taken from either parent if desired (such as in the case of a dispute between parents) under Article 22 of the "Marriage Law". Thus, the government does not interfere with the will of the person or their parents in the selection of a surname, provided that it is taken from one parent. Citizens also have the right to select their given names and aliases, in which the government has no right to interfere.

There are also no restrictions on previously used names by the government, which fully permits the usage of "well-known" names. It is not illegal to name a child after a famous celebrity, company, or product, as copyright and trademark laws do not apply to personal names. Consequently, this is able to lead to legal issues regarding intellectual property rights and legal matters, as the person is then known by the name given according to law, which opens the possibility for confusion where a personal name is exactly the same to a company or another person, such as during a court case or the creation of legal documents.

Latin characters, numerals and other non-Chinese symbols are prohibited, as they do not constitute part of a Chinese name under government law. Only Chinese characters are permitted; however, characters which are unable to be input on computers are also disallowed. There are no limits on the number of characters used, as this may vary depending on the name (typical Chinese names on average constitute 2 to 3 characters, with 4 or more characters being rare; however, non-Han ethnic groups such as Mongols, Tibetans and Uighurs have many syllables after transliteration into Standard Chinese).

There are no laws which restrict a person's surname to one character like most Han Chinese names, since some people of Han Chinese ethnicity have Chinese compound surnames, and it is very common for foreign residents and ethnic minorities to have long surname transcriptions. However, since the Government of the People's Republic of China does not recognise Mongolian clan names as surnames, people of Mongol ethnicity usually only have a registered given name and no surname (which are absent on their identification cards, whilst their passports would have "XXX" in the surname field), although some individuals choose to adopt a single-character Han Chinese surname that resembles an abbreviation of their clan name.

== Technical issues ==
There are over 70,000 known Chinese characters, but as of 2009 approximately only 32,232 were supported for computer input, including both Traditional and Simplified characters (see GBK (character encoding) etc. There is ongoing work in Unicode to support the others, see CJK Unified Ideographs). As the government database of personal names is maintained digitally on government networks, input of rarer characters becomes virtually impossible, thus creating an irremovable restriction on permitted names. All citizens within the People's Republic of China must have their details registered on the government computer network, while those over the age of 16 must carry an identification card, known in China as a Resident Identity Card at all times. As these processes are all done electronically, having a name which is not supported by electronic input makes government registration and the management of ID cards much more difficult.

== Religious naming restrictions ==
In 2017, the Chinese Communist Party enacted bans on a list of Muslim names it deemed "too extreme", or may have "connotations of holy war or of splittism (separatism)". Examples include "Islam", "Quran", "Mecca", "Jihad", "Imam", "Saddam", "Muhammad", "Hajj", and "Medina", among others. Legislation in 2017 made it illegal to give children names that the Chinese government deemed to "exaggerate religious fervor".

== Notable cases ==
=== Ma Cheng ===
The temporary Resident ID Card of Ma Cheng, with a handwritten "Cheng" character. Note that Ma Cheng's name appears in Simplified Chinese. (Note: The character which appears on the ID card is a Simplified Chinese variant character of, adapted to match other characters in the PRC, using the simplified 马 (ma, "horse") character. The simplified variant is encoded at 𱅒 U+31152, in the block CJK Unified Ideographs Extension G.)

Ma Cheng (Chinese: 马𩧢 (some browsers will be unable to display the second character, which is three 馬 horses placed horizontally), pinyin: Mǎ Chěng) is a woman from Beijing who, due to her obscure name, frequently encounters issues regarding name registration in places such as airports and police stations. Ma explained on BTV-7 that her parents were inspired by a trend where given names are made up of a tripled surname, as in Jin Xin 金鑫, Xiao Mo 小尛, Yu Xian 魚鱻 and Shi Lei 石磊, and so her grandfather found her name in the Zhonghua Zihai, the largest Chinese character dictionary. Pronounced "Cheng", this character can be found in the Kangxi Dictionary, where it is listed as a variant character of 骋 (gallop). There is also the comparatively more common stacked character 骉, but it does not accurately reflect her name because it has a different pronunciation. While some vendors may write her name by hand, those that are strictly electronically managed, such as the Public Security Bureau, are unable to correctly enter her name. Because of this, some computers record her name as 马CHENG or 马马马马. (Compare this practice with the previous technical issues of inputting the Chinese name of the Taiwanese singer David Tao (Chinese: 陶喆; pinyin: Tao Zhe), where before the input of zhe 喆 became supported on computers, many media sources often rendered his name as Tao Jiji 陶吉吉, using two ji 吉 in place of the zhe 喆.)

=== Zhao C ===
Zhao C (Chinese: 赵C; pinyin: Zhào C) is a well-known example, having attracted much media attention due to a bizarre case regarding a forced name change by the government due to naming regulations. This case is the first of name rights in the People's Republic of China. Zhao, whose personal name is the Latin alphabet letter C, could no longer use his name, as the government does not accept Latin characters in Chinese names, and the Latin character "C" is part of the national standard for "numbers and symbols" of the People's Republic of China. The 22-year-old man, having used the given name "C" for his entire life, was refused the right to continue using his name when he was required to update his ID card to a second-generation version. The local Public Security Bureau informed him that his name violated the rules, and that their computers were not equipped to handle non-standard characters. He sued the bureau, and, though he won his initial case, the bureau appealed, and Zhao settled out of court, agreeing to change his name.

=== Wang "At" ===
Wang "At" (Chinese: 王@; pinyin: Wáng "at") is the name that a Chinese couple attempted to give to their newborn baby. It was subsequently rejected. The couple claimed that the character used in e-mail addresses echoed their love for the child, where in Chinese, "@" is pronounced as "ai-ta", which is similar to 爱他, literally "love him".

=== Other ===
- Xin Ge (辛哿) – A man with a given name meaning "satisfactory" and "fine" also had difficulty in the registering of his name due to an unsupported character, until his name was added to the system in 2006.

== See also ==
- Chinese name
- Chinese surname
- Chinese input methods for computers
- Naming law
- Naming law in Sweden - for similar cases in Sweden
