= Lazy Greek stereotype =

Stereotype of Greek people

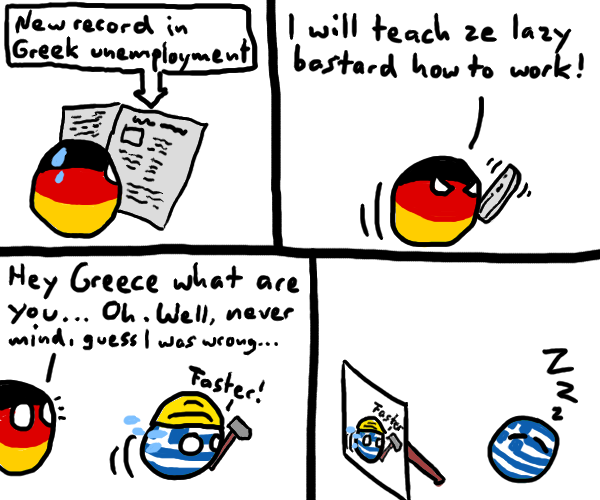
A Countryballs comic depicting an angry Germany accusing Greece of laziness. German and Northern European news media have been accused of perpetuating the stereotype.

The "lazy Greek" stereotype is the stereotype that Greek people work less than people of other European countries. The stereotype has been used to attack Greece during the Greek economic crisis.

== Characteristics ==
In the stereotype, Greek people are characterized as "lazy and irresponsible", not needing to work for their money and instead receiving money through bailouts by the European Union. Greeks may be portrayed as greedy, such as in the demand by German tabloid Bild for "no more billions for greedy Greeks".

Other Southern European countries, such as Spain and Portugal, have also been deemed "lazy" — Greece and these countries, along with Italy and/or Ireland, have been grouped in the acronym PIGS to describe their economies during the debt crisis.

== Examples ==
In 2010, Anders Borg, Sweden's Finance Minister, said that "Obviously, Swedes and other taxpayers should not have to pay for Greeks who choose to retire in their 40s."

The German tabloid Bild claimed that "Greece, but also Spain and Portugal have to understand that hard work – meaning ironfisted money-saving – comes before the siesta."

A 2015 BBC report interviewed some Greeks in Germany who described claims about Greeks they had heard, such as that "we [Germans] pay for you" and that Greeks were "...so lazy, [they] don't like to work."

== Statistics ==
Contrary to the stereotype, 2013 data from the OECD showed that Greeks had the highest amount of working hours per week on average. Pascal Marianna, a labor market statistician at the OECD, has said that this is because "The Greek labour market is composed of a large number of people who are self-employed, meaning farmers and — on the other hand — shop-keepers who are working long hours."

== Legacy ==
In a 2025 interview, Angela Merkel, the former Chancellor of Germany, condemned the stereotype, but said that she would not apologize for how she handled the debt crisis.

In a contrast to the stereotype, in 2025 German Chancellor Friedrich Merz praised Greece's work ethic compared to Germany in a conversation with Greece's Prime Minister Kyriakos Mitsotakis.

== See also ==
- Anti-Greek sentiment
- Germany–Greece relations
