= Follow the Light (Molly Nilsson album) =

Studio album by Molly Nilsson
- Released: 7 June 2010
- Recorded: 2009–2010
- Studio: Lighthouse Studios, Berlin
- Genre: Synth-pop
- Length: 28:53
- Label: Dark Skies Association
- Producer: Molly Nilsson

Molly Nilsson chronology
| Europa (2009) | Follow the Light (2010) | History (2011) |

Singles from Follow the Light
- 1. "Truth" Released: 13 November 2009; 2. "Last Forever" Released: 28 January 2011; 3. "A Song They Won't Be Playing on the Radio" Released: 4 May 2011; 4. "The Closest We'll Ever Get to Heaven" Released: 7 September 2011

Follow the Light is the third (Note: Follow the Light, Nilsson’s third album, has erroneously been referred to as her second album, including in the press release of her label Night School Records. Her preceding album, Europa, was (correctly) referred to as her second album in the press release, too.) studio album by Swedish singer-songwriter Molly Nilsson, released on 7 June 2010.

== Background ==
Regarding Follow the Light, Nilsson said that she was "a little bit disillusioned and confused about what [she] was going to do" after her previous album Europa (2009) had not sold as well as expected. In 2022, Nilsson looked back fondly on the album, saying: "I’m very critical of almost everything I do, but when I look back on that album, I do think it’s a really fun one. I don’t think there’s one bad song on there."

== Themes ==
Memory has been cited as a central topic on Follow the Light, specifically on the songs "The Closest We'll Ever Get to Heaven" and "I'm Still Wearing His Jacket".

== Release ==
Follow the Light was originally self-released through Nilsson's label Dark Skies Association on CD on 7 June 2010. After the start of Nilsson's cooperation with Night School Records, the album was reissued on CD and released on vinyl in January 2017. It was then released as a digital download on 3 February 2017. A second vinyl repressing followed on 23 February 2019.

== Promotion ==
A short "infomercial" video for the album was released by Dark Skies Association on 8 August 2010.

== Critical reception ==
Professional ratings
Review scores
| Source | Rating |
|---|---|
| AllMusic | 3.5/5 stars |
| Norman Records | 4/5 stars |

Robin Smith, in a positive review for Norman Records, called Follow the Light a "delight to listen to" and commended its musical cohesiveness. In another positive review, Tim Sendra of AllMusic considered the album a "wonderfully intimate document of outsider art", while praising Nilsson's unique lyrics and musical evolution when compared with prior works.

== Track listing ==
All tracks are written by Molly Nilsson.

Follow the Light track listing
| No. | Title | Length |
|---|---|---|
| 1. | "The Closest We'll Ever Get to Heaven" | 3:04 |
| 2. | "Meanwhile in Berlin" | 3:20 |
| 3. | "Never O'Clock" | 4:18 |
| 4. | "Last Forever" | 3:00 |
| 5. | "Truth" | 3:18 |
| 6. | "I Hope You Sleep at Night" | 1:16 |
| 7. | "I'm Still Wearing His Jacket" | 4:06 |
| 8. | "Hello Loneliness" | 2:02 |
| 9. | "A Song They Won't Be Playing on the Radio" | 4:28 |
| Total length: | | 28:53 |
