= Göran Greider =

Swedish journalist, author and poet (born 1959)

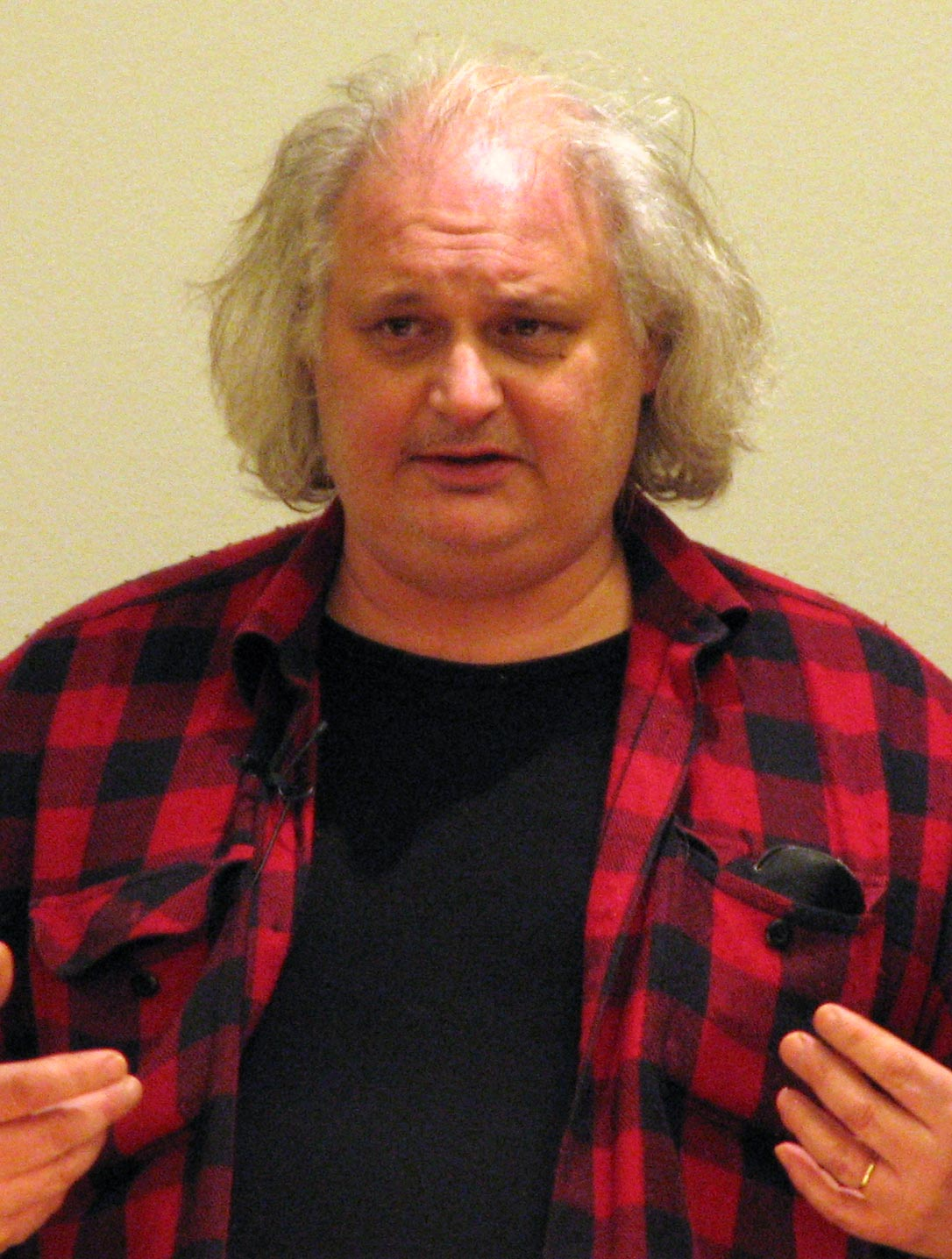
- Greider in 2009
- Born: 12 December 1959 (age 66); Vingåker, Sweden
- Occupations: Journalist, writer

Per Göran Greider (born 1959) is a Swedish social democratic journalist, author and poet. Greider's poetry was first published in 1981.

Greider has been the editor in chief of the provincial newspaper Dala-Demokraten since 1999. He is a prominent left-wing advocate in panel discussions on radio (Sveriges Radio) and television (TV4) and in the Swedish public debate at large.
