= Stockholms Fria Tidning =

Stockholms Fria Tidning (SFT) is a weekly newspaper started in May 2001. The founders of the newspaper believe that Sweden suffers from similarity of reporting and concentration of ownership in the mainstream media. SFT is owned by a cooperative of the people working with the paper. All employees have the same salary regardless of their duties.

It is currently only published on Saturdays and is sold in 5,000-10,000 copies. The goal is that during 2006 publish it five days a week.

Those who run the newspaper also started the similar newspapers Göteborgs Fria Tidning and Skånes Fria Tidning, Fria Tidningen and Sesam på lätt svenska. In May 2004 they acquired Östhammars Nyheter.

In April 2018 the operational control of Fria Tidningen was taken over by Mediehuset Grön AB. As of December 2021 the newspaper is published twice a week.
