= Dala-Demokraten =

Social democratic newspaper in Sweden

- Editor-in-chief: Göran Greider
- Founded: 1917; 109 years ago
- Language: Swedish
- Headquarters: Falun, Sweden
- ISSN: 1103-9183
- Website: www.dalademokraten.se

Dala-Demokraten is a Swedish social democratic newspaper published in Falun, Dalarna, Sweden. It has been in circulation since 1917.

== History and profile ==
Dala-Demokraten was established in 1917. The paper has a social democrat stance. The outspoken Social Democrat Göran Greider is the paper's political editor. In the 1970s, female journalists working for the paper supported a more gender-equal workplace.

Dala-Demokraten sold 24,400 copies in 1996. In 2010, the paper had a circulation of 16,400 copies. The circulation of the paper was 16,100 copies in 2011.
