= 2020 (Molly Nilsson album) =

Studio album by Molly Nilsson
- Released: 2 November 2018
- Recorded: c. 2017–2018
- Studio: Lighthouse Studios, Berlin
- Genre: Synth-pop
- Length: 36:17
- Label: Dark Skies Association; Night School
- Producer: Molly Nilsson

Molly Nilsson chronology
Imaginations (2017)	2020 (2018)	Extreme (2022)

Singles from 2020
- 1. "Serious Flowers" Released: 9 July 2018; 2. "A Slice of Lemon" Released: 10 August 2018; 3. "Days of Dust" Released: 11 September 2018; 4. "Gun Control" Released: 23 November 2018; 5. "Every Night Is New" Released: 21 December 2018

2020 (also written as 20/20, Twenty Twenty, and Twenty-Twenty) is the eighth studio album by Swedish singer-songwriter Molly Nilsson, released on 2 November 2018.

== Background ==
The album takes its title from the year 2020, inspired by posters for the 2020 Summer Olympics that Nilsson saw during a trip to Tokyo in 2017, and by the then-upcoming 2020 United States presidential election. The fact that the year is a leap year and its similarity to "20/20 vision" also inspired Nilsson.

== Production ==
Nilsson started working on 2020 when the release of her previous album Imaginations was delayed. As usual, the album was recorded in her own Lighthouse Studios in Berlin.

== Themes ==
2020 is set in the then-near future and is "at least a little bit of a concept album".

The album has been described as political and anti-capitalist, with one writer saying it is about the "thrill and terror of living in late-capitalist end times". It deals with topics including the patriarchy, climate change, gun control, and the passage of time. Several writers highlighted the album's optimistic outlook despite the topics it addresses.

== Release and promotion ==
The album's first single "Serious Flowers" was released on 9 July 2018, along with a music video. A second music video, for "A Slice of Lemon", followed on 10 August 2018. On 11 September 2018, a third music video was released for "Days of Dust".

2020 was released on vinyl, CD, cassette tape, and as a digital download on 2 November 2018. It was available for streaming on NPR a week before its official release. It was made available on Spotify around half a year after its original release.

== Critical reception ==
Professional ratings
Review scores
Source	Rating
AllMusic	4/5 stars
Les Oreilles Curieuses	8.5/10
The Line of Best Fit	7.5/10
Loud and Quiet	7/10

The album received positive reviews. Ben Beaumont-Thomas of The Guardian rated the album "similarly excellent" as Nilsson's preceding album Imaginations (2017), while Shaad D'Souza of The Fader declared it her "best album to date".

In a positive review, Tim Sendra of AllMusic called the album Nilsson's "warmest, most accessible album yet", concluding that it "features Nilsson at her best as a songwriter, performer, and crafter of lightly gloomy synth pop". In another positive review, Claire Biddles of The Line of Best Fit noted the "warmth of [Nilsson's] arrangements and lyrical sentiment" and described the album as an "excellent record about salvaging hope from worldly and interpersonal wreckage". Ollie Rankine, in a positive review for Loud and Quiet, noted Nilsson's "vigour and optimism" in the face of a "gloomy forecast of our collective future".

In a review of "Days of Dust", Sophie Kemp of Pitchfork said that the song "takes [its] listener to the final golden hour before the metaphorical end of the world" and noted its nostalgic, ironic, and macabre undertones. Leah Mandel of NPR highlighted "Blinded by the Night" as "the record's most haunting track".

== Track listing ==
All tracks are written by Molly Nilsson.

2020 track listing
No.	Title	Length
1.	"Every Night is New"	3:45
2.	"A Slice of Lemon"	3:52
3.	"Out of the Blue"	2:47
4.	"Your Shyness"	3:32
5.	"Intermezzo: My Mental Motorcycle"	3:10
6.	"Serious Flowers"	4:03
7.	"I'm Your Fan"	2:35
8.	"Gun Control"	3:51
9.	"Days of Dust"	3:32
10.	"Blinded by the Night"	5:00
Total length:		36:17
