= Imaginations (Molly Nilsson album) =

Studio album by Molly Nilsson
- Released: 26 May 2017
- Studio: Lighthouse Studios, Berlin
- Genre: Synth-pop
- Length: 44:24
- Label: Dark Skies Association; Night School
- Producer: Molly Nilsson

Molly Nilsson chronology
Zenith (2015)	Imaginations (2017)	2020 (2018)

Singles from Imaginations
- 1. "Think Pink" Released: 4 July 2016; 2. "Let's Talk About Privileges" Released: 3 October 2016; 3. "Money Never Dreams" Released: 9 December 2016; 4. "Not Today, Satan" Released: 14 February 2017

Imaginations is the seventh (Note: Imaginations, Nilsson’s seventh album, has erroneously been referred to as her eighth album, including in the press release of her label Night School Records. The following album, 2020, was then correctly referred to as her eighth album in the press release, too.) studio album by Swedish singer-songwriter Molly Nilsson, released on 26 May 2017.

== Background ==
The album was inspired by Nilsson's travels across Europe and Central America. Regarding the album's title, she gave the following anecdote: "I had a very different vision when I started [the album], but life interrupted me and had other plans. It was supposed to be called something else but a dream told me to call it Imaginations."

== Production ==
Nilsson wrote Imaginations in the first half of 2016. Regarding the album's production, she stated that it was "maybe the one [she] struggled the most with".

== Themes ==
Imaginations has been noted to be critical of neoliberalism, capitalism and the political landscape of 2017. For example, the song "Money Never Dreams" has been referred to as an "anti-greed anthem". Nonetheless, the album has been described as having an optimistic outlook. Nilsson acknowledged that the album's "tone seems more political", but that it is also "very personal" at the same time.

== Release ==
Imaginations was released on vinyl, CD, cassette tape, and as a digital download on 26 May 2017. The album was originally set to be released in January 2017, but it was delayed.

== Critical reception ==
Professional ratings
Review scores
Source	Rating
AllMusic	3.5/5 stars
Loud and Quiet	8/10
Mondo Sonoro	8/10
Norman Records	4/5 stars

Imaginations received positive reviews. Ben Beaumont-Thomas, writing for The Guardian, declared it Nilsson's "masterpiece" and "one of the best records of [2017]". Tom Breihan of Stereogum referred to the album as "impressive". Rachel Redfern of Loud and Quiet wrote that Imaginations shows Nilsson "at her melodic best".

Tim Sendra of AllMusic concluded that, with Imaginations, Nilsson "has found the sweet spot between intensely personal music and universally understood pop", while praising the "very evocative and rich [melodies]" and "lush instrumentation". Robin Smith of Norman Records declared the album "[Nilsson's] best ever record of distant pop music" and noted its "expansive and bursting" sound. Jake Folsom, writing for WMPG, lauded the album's production and Nilsson's "witty, honest [and] empowering" lyrics.

The song "Let's Talk About Privileges" was positively highlighted by several writers.

== Track listing ==
All tracks are written by Molly Nilsson.

Imaginations track listing
No.	Title	Length
1.	"Tender Surrender"	3:58
2.	"Let's Talk About Privileges"	4:03
3.	"Mona Lisa's Smile"	3:10
4.	"Memory Foam"	3:44
5.	"American Express"	4:34
6.	"Money Never Dreams"	3:09
7.	"Not Today, Satan"	4:23
8.	"Think Pink"	3:22
9.	"Modern World"	2:46
10.	"Inner Cities"	3:58
11.	"Theory of Life"	3:43
12.	"After Life"	3:33
Total length:		44:24
