= Söderström Medal for Economics =

Award established in 1907 by the Royal Swedish Academy of Sciences

- Location: Stockholm
- Country: Sweden
- Presented by: Royal Swedish Academy of Sciences
- First award: 1907
- Most recent recipient: Erik Lundberg (1980)

Highlights
- Total: 12

The Söderström Medal in Economics (Swedish: Söderströmska medaljen) was an award in economic sciences, presented by the Royal Swedish Academy of Science in Stockholm, Sweden. First awarded in 1907, the most recent recipient was awarded in 1980.

The Söderström Medal was superseded by the Nobel Memorial Prize in Economic Sciences, also awarded by the Academy, established in 1968 by Sweden's central bank, Sveriges Riksbank, to celebrate its 300th anniversary and in memory of Alfred Nobel.

== List of winners ==
Winners of the Söderström Medal for Economics
No.	Winners	Year	Nationality	Institution(s)	Field(s)	Notes
1	Gustav Gröndal	1907				
2	David Davidson	1912	Sweden	Uppsala University	Neo-Ricardianism	
3	Gustav Cassel	1922	Sweden	Stockholm University	Mathematical economics	
4	Marcus Wallenberg Sr	1927	Sweden	Stockholms Enskilda Bank	Banking; Industrial lending	
5	Eli Heckscher	1933	Sweden	Stockholm School of Economics	Political economics; Economic history; Heckscher–Ohlin theorem	
6	John Maynard Keynes	1939	United Kingdom	King's College, Cambridge	Macroeconomics; Keynesian economics	
7	Gunnar Myrdal	1947	Sweden	Stockholm School	Macroeconomics	
8	Piero Sraffa	1961	Italy	Trinity College, Cambridge	Political economics; Neo-Ricardianism	
9	Alvin Hansen	1964	United States	Harvard	Macroeconomics; Political economics; Neo-Keynesian; Hicks–Hansen synthesis	
10	Tarlok Singh	1970	India	Planning Commission of India	Land economics; Poverty alleviation	
11	François Perroux	1971	France	University of Lyon; University of Paris	Corporatism; Regional economics	
12	Erik Lundberg	1980	Sweden	Stockholm University	Political economics; Macroeconomics; Keynesian	

== See also ==
- List of economics awards
- List of prizes named after people
