= Per Jacobsson =

Swedish economist (1894–1963)

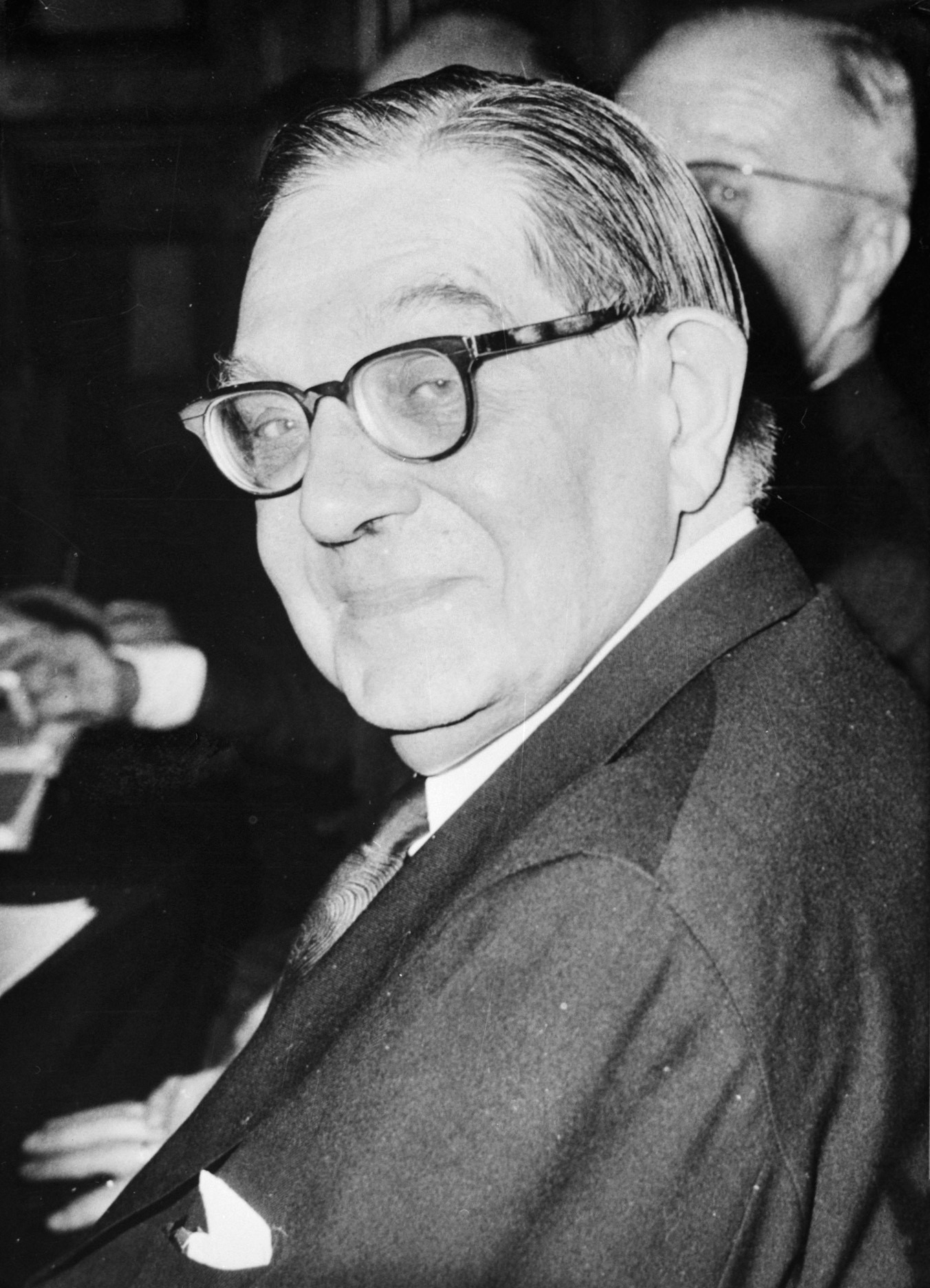
- Jacobsson in 1962

Managing director of the International Monetary Fund
- In office 21 November 1956 – 5 May 1963
- Preceded by: Ivar Rooth
- Succeeded by: Pierre-Paul Schweitzer

Personal details
- Born: 5 February 1894 Tanum, Bohuslän, Sweden
- Died: 5 May 1963 (aged 69) London, United Kingdom
- Education: Uppsala University
- Profession: Economist

Per Jacobsson (5 February 1894 – 5 May 1963) was a Swedish economist who served as the first and longstanding chief economist of the Bank for International Settlements from 1931 to 1956, and as the managing director of the International Monetary Fund (IMF) from 1956 until his death in 1963.

== Early life ==
Per Jacobsson was born in Tanum, Bohuslän, in Sweden. His parents were Carl Julius Jacobsson, a veterinary surgeon, and Emma Kristina Jacobsson (maiden name Melander). His family moved to Västerås, where he attended Rudbeckianska a secondary school founded in 1623. He then went to Uppsala University from 1912 to 1919. In his first term he studied economics, statistics and sociology, among other topics, but then in his second term switched to studying law. He received two law degrees from the university, in 1917 and 1919 respectively. However, he was able to undertake extensive studies in economics, mastering the subject. In 1914 he had an oral examination in economics given by David Davidson an economics professor. After that, Davidson told Per Jacobsson to consider succeeding him as an economics professor at the university. In the course of his studies, Per Jacobsson was highly influenced by Knut Wicksell. Over time at university he became more sociable. In 1917 he became president of the student club linked to his home town, Vastmanland-Dala Nation and in 1918 president of a student liberal political club, Verdandi.

Before he obtained his last degree, he spent a considerable amount of time in Stockholm. There he came into frequent contact with leading Swedish economists, joining an economics club started in 1917. Its senior members were Gustav Cassel, David Davidson, Knut Wicksell, and Eli Heckscher. He also had diverse work experiences, drawing on his knowledge of law and economics. He was variously: researcher for a commission on the post-war Swedish economy, assistant in the Court of Appeals, clerk at the Ministry of Finance, assistant teacher at the School of Forestry, and writer for various newspapers. In the latter role he wrote a review of a book by Gustav Cassell, who was Impressed by it. When Marcus Wallenburg Sr. asked Cassell to recommend a Swede to join the Secretariat of the League of Nations, he suggested Per Jacobsson. He was offered the post and accepted it.

== Work at the League of Nations ==
In April 1920 he became an international civil servant, by joining the League of Nations' Secretariat, and specifically what a few years later would be known as the Economic and Financial Organization. This had a Financial Committee for which he worked, eventually becoming its secretary. It took on assisting cities and countries in post-war economic difficulties, including high inflation. The committee developed a typical way of operating. Its staff would visit a capital, research the economic situation and write a report with recommendations. These generally included central government spending cuts and revenue increases and creating or strengthening an independent central bank to control issuance of the domestic currency. Loans could be organized to fund government deficits before agreed-to budgetary measures took full effect. Its work therefore was a precursor to International Monetary Fund country studies and conditional lending. Per Jacobsson participated in this process for the Free City of Danzig in 1921, and Austria and Hungary starting in 1922. The latter countries were lent £90 million in aggregate, which was repaid in 1926, and their government budgets became balanced in 1927.

Piet Clement, a financial historian, wrote that Per Jacobsson's work for the committee "left a deep imprint on his further career...because it taught him to quickly analyze a multitude of qualitative and quantitative data at an aggregated and comparative level, and to formulate conclusions and recommendations in a nevertheless pertinent and precise style."

While at the League, Per Jacobsson also worked on national arms spending data that would be comparable across countries. This was one element in the League's efforts to limit spending on armaments and reduce the risk of a major armed conflict recurring. His work was published as a supplement to the Economist newspaper in October 1929. He continued his work on this after leaving the League as an outside expert, contributing to a report prepared for the World Disarmament Conference which first met in February 1932.

(After leaving the League, he returned to Sweden and worked from January 1929 to July 1930 at the Swedish Economic Defence Commission which was studying preparation for the eventuality of another war, and then from July 1930 to September 1931 as Economic Adviser to a Swedish industrial company, Kreuger and Toll.)

== Work at the Bank for International Settlements ==
Jacobsson was employed at the Bank of International Settlements (BIS) from 1931 to 1956, and played a key role in defining the BIS's institutional identity. In particular, he wrote the BIS annual reports which were essential reading in the international economic and central banking communities.

== Work at the International Monetary Fund ==
In December 1956, he was appointed as the managing director of the International Monetary Fund (IMF), a position he held until his death on 5 May 1963.

== Personal life ==
He married Violet Nye, who was working for the League of Nations, in 1921. They had three daughters, Erin, Birgit and Moyra. Jacobsson's daughter Moyra, an artist, married Roger Bannister, the British Olympic athlete and neurologist who was the first person to run the four-minute mile.

He was buried in the Swedish section of Brookwood Cemetery.

== Legacy ==
The Per Jacobsson Foundation was established in 1964 to honor his memory and sponsors prestigious lectures, many of which have been given on the occasion of the annual meetings of the IMF and World Bank in Washington DC.

== Gallery ==
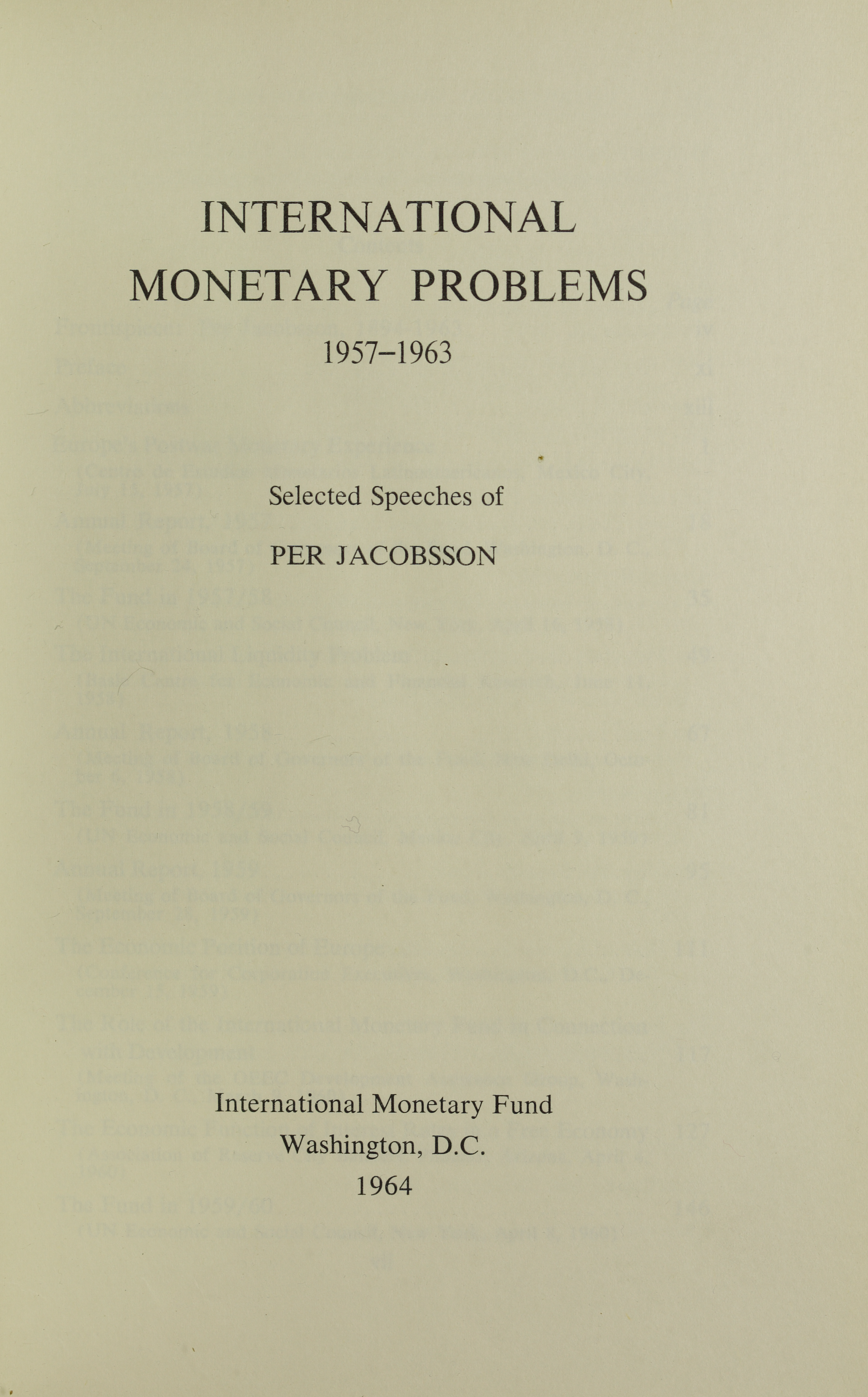
International monetary problems (1964)

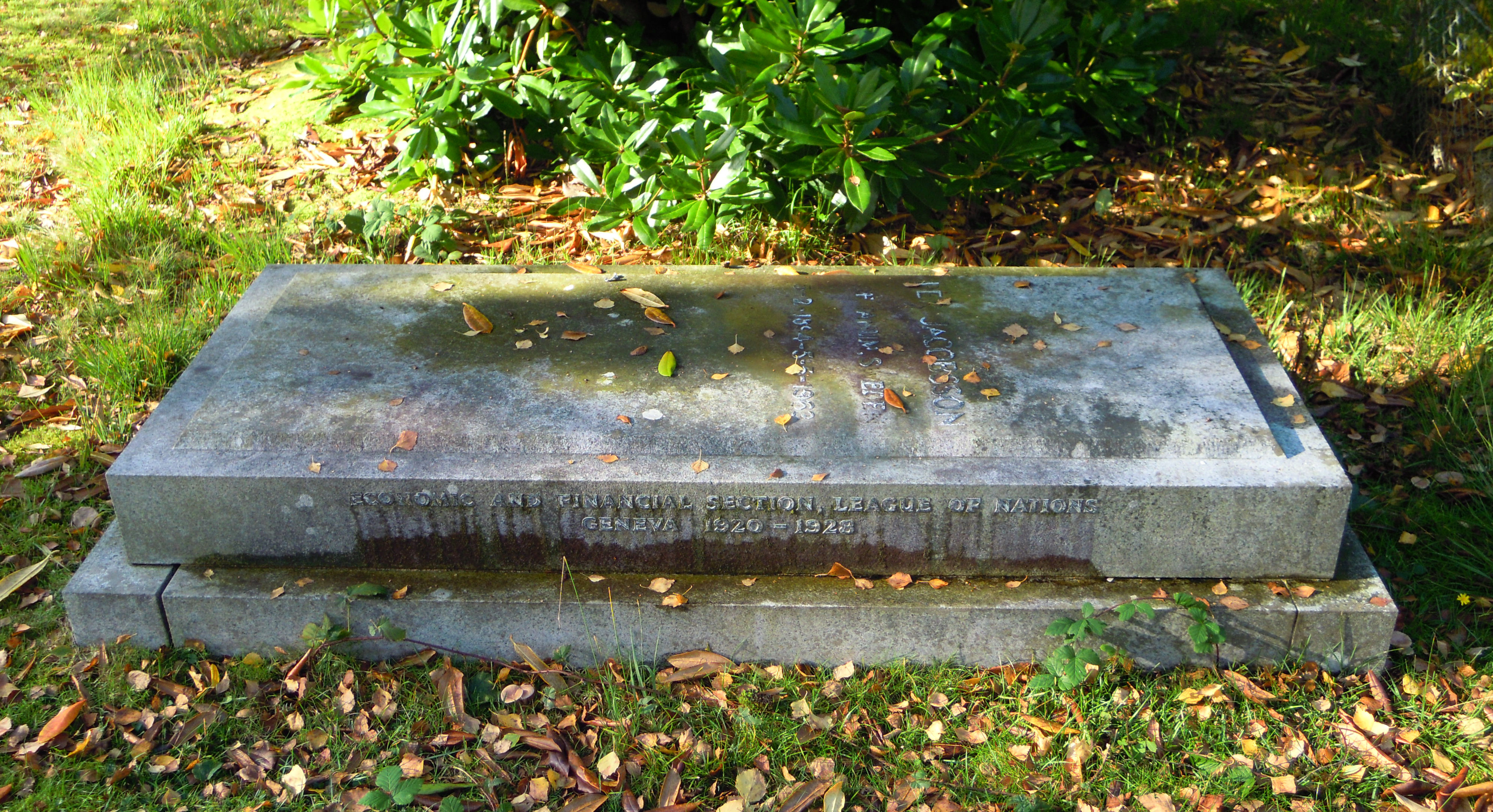
Jacobsson's grave in Brookwood Cemetery

== See also ==
- Pierre Quesnay

Civic offices
Preceded by Ivar Rooth	Head of the International Monetary Fund; 1956–1963	Succeeded by Pierre-Paul Schweitzer
