= The Economic Consequences of the Peace =

1919 book by John Maynard Keynes

- Title page for The Economic Consequences of the Peace first American edition (1920)
- Author: John Maynard Keynes
- Language: English
- Subject: Economic
- Publication date: 1919
- Publication place: United Kingdom

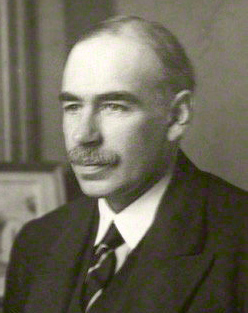
John Maynard Keynes in the 1920s

The Economic Consequences of the Peace (1919) is a book written and published by the British economist John Maynard Keynes. After the First World War, Keynes attended the Paris Peace Conference of 1919 as a delegate of the British Treasury and deputy to the Chancellor of the Exchequer on the Supreme Economic Council. Becoming ill, he resigned from the position and returned early from the conference, believing that there was 'no hope' of an economically sustainable settlement. In this book, he presents his arguments for a much less onerous treaty, not just for the sake of German civilians but for the sake of the economic well-being of all of Europe and beyond, including the Allied Powers, which in his view the Treaty of Versailles and its associated treaties endangered.

The book was a commercial success, and a central influence in creating the popular view that the treaties were a "Carthaginian peace" designed to crush the defeated Central Powers, especially Germany. It helped to consolidate American public opinion against the treaties and against joining the League of Nations. The perception by much of the British public that Germany had been treated unfairly was, in turn, a crucial factor in later public support for the appeasement of Hitler.

However, in the preface to the French translation of the book, Keynes did not apportion blame in the same way. He wrote: "However, we do not hold France solely responsible for the disastrous treaty. All the countries that took part in the negotiations played a role. England, it may be said, was quick to satisfy her selfish interests, and it is she, above all others, who must be blamed for the form of the chapter on Reparations. She took Germany's colonies and navy and a larger share of the compensation than she was entitled to."

The success of the book established Keynes' reputation as a leading economist.

== Context ==
As an academic, Keynes had worked on his Treatise on Probability, which includes a critique of conventional economic thinking under conditions that are unusual, unstable, complicated and/or unreliable. In 1915 Keynes left Cambridge University to work at the Treasury. He worked daily on financing the war effort during World War I. That disturbed many of the pacifist members of the Bloomsbury Group of which he was a member. Lytton Strachey sent him a note in 1916 asking Keynes why he was still working at the Treasury.

Keynes quickly established a reputation as one of the Treasury's most able men and travelled to the Versailles Conference as an advisor to the British Government. In preparation for the conference, he argued that there should preferably be no reparations or that German reparations should be limited to £2,000 million. He considered that there should be a general forgiveness of war debts, which, he considered, would benefit Britain. Lastly, Keynes wanted the US government to launch a vast credit programme to restore Europe to prosperity as soon as possible.

His general concern was that the Versailles conference should set the conditions for economic recovery. However, the conference focused on borders and national security. Keynes believed that the reparations being proposed at the time of writing in 1919 (the monetary value and terms of payment were not decided until the 1921 London schedule was agreed), would result in the ruin of the Europe. Woodrow Wilson, the President of the United States, who represented his country at the conference, refused to countenance forgiveness of war debts and US Treasury officials would not even discuss the credit programme.

During the conference, Keynes' health deteriorated, and he resigned from his position in frustration as a protest on 26 May 1919, before the Treaty of Versailles was signed on 28 June. He returned to Cambridge and wrote The Economic Consequences of the Peace over two months in the summer. Although a best seller, and highly influential, especially to those who already had doubts about the Treaty, it has also been described as "a diatribe". Keynes went on to publish his Treatise, expanding on the theme of his Introductory and then updated his views on a revision to the treaty.

== Contents ==
=== Introductory ===
Keynes diagnosed the situation leading up to the war thus:

The power to become habituated to his surroundings is a marked characteristic of mankind. Very few of us realize with conviction the intensely unusual, unstable, complicated, unreliable, temporary nature of the economic organization by which Western Europe has lived for the last half century. We assume some of the most peculiar and temporary of our late advantages as natural, permanent, and to be depended on, and we lay our plans accordingly. On this sandy and false foundation we scheme for social improvement and dress our political platforms, pursue our animosities and particular ambitions, and feel ourselves with enough margin in hand to foster, not assuage, civil conflict in the European family. Moved by insane delusion and reckless self-regard, the German people overturned the foundations on which we all lived and built. But the spokesmen of the French and British peoples have run the risk of completing the ruin, which Germany began, by a Peace which, if it is carried into effect, must impair yet further, when it might have restored, the delicate, complicated organization, already shaken and broken by war, through which alone the European peoples can employ themselves and live.

=== Europe before the War ===
Keynes continues:

The inhabitant of London ... regarded this state of affairs as normal, certain, and permanent, except in the direction of further improvement, and any deviation from it as aberrant, scandalous, and avoidable. The projects and politics of militarism and imperialism, of racial and cultural rivalries, of monopolies, restrictions, and exclusion, which were to play the serpent to this paradise, were little more than the amusements of his daily newspaper, and appeared to exercise almost no influence at all on the ordinary course of social and economic life, the internationalization of which was nearly complete in practice.

=== Conference ===
Keynes described the conference as a clash of values and world views of the principal leaders, pitting what has been called "the cynical traditions of European power politics [against] the promise of a more enlightened order."

My purpose in this book is to show that the Carthaginian Peace is not practically right or possible. Although the school of thought from which it springs is aware of the economic factor, it overlooks, nevertheless, the deeper economic tendencies which are to govern the future. The clock cannot be set back. You cannot restore Central Europe to 1870 without setting up such strains in the European structure and letting loose such human and spiritual forces as, pushing beyond frontiers and races, will overwhelm not only you and your "guarantees," but your institutions, and the existing order of your Society.

Keynes describes Wilson as guardian of the hopes of men of good will of all nations.

When President Wilson left Washington he enjoyed a prestige and a moral influence throughout the world unequalled in history. His bold and measured words carried to the peoples of Europe above and beyond the voices of their own politicians. The enemy peoples trusted him to carry out the compact he had made with them; and the Allied peoples acknowledged him not as a victor only but almost as a prophet. In addition to this moral influence the realities of power were in his hands. The American armies were at the height of their numbers, discipline, and equipment. Europe was in complete dependence on the food supplies of the United States; and financially she was even more absolutely at their mercy. Europe not only already owed the United States more than she could pay; but only a large measure of further assistance could save her from starvation and bankruptcy. Never had a philosopher held such weapons wherewith to bind the princes of this world. How the crowds of the European capitals pressed about the carriage of the President! With what curiosity, anxiety, and hope we sought a glimpse of the features and bearing of the man of destiny who, coming from the West, was to bring healing to the wounds of the ancient parent of his civilisation and lay for us the foundations of the future.

French Prime Minister Georges Clemenceau shaped the outcome of the conference more than anyone else:

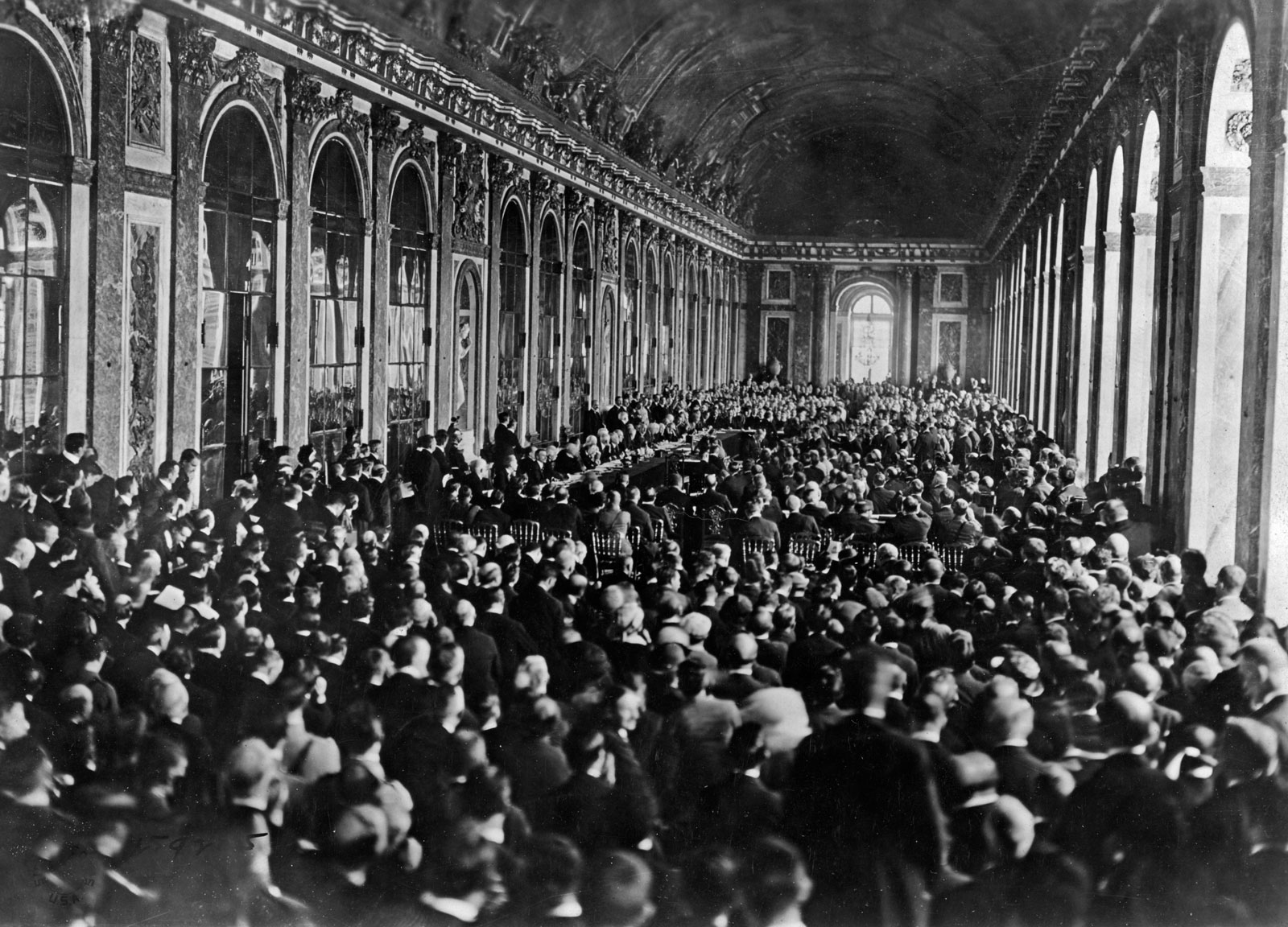
The signing of the Treaty of Versailles on 28 June 1919 in the Hall of Mirrors of the Palace of Versailles

[Clemenceau] took the view that European civil war is to be regarded as a normal, or at least a recurrent, state of affairs for the future, and that the sort of conflicts between organised Great Powers which have occupied the past hundred years will also engage the next. According to this vision of the future, European history is to be a perpetual prize-fight, of which France has won this round, but of which this round is certainly not the last. From the belief that essentially the old order does not change, being based on human nature which is always the same, and from a consequent scepticism of all that class of doctrine which the League of Nations stands for, the policy of France and of Clemenceau followed logically. For a peace of magnanimity or of fair and equal treatment, based on such 'ideology' as the Fourteen Points of the President, could only have the effect of shortening the interval of Germany's recovery and hastening the day when she will once again hurl at France her greater numbers and her superior resources and technical skill.

=== Treaty ===
The heart of the book is his two profound criticisms of the treaty. Firstly, he argues as an economist that Europe could not prosper without an equitable, effective and integrated economic system, which was impossible by the economic terms of the treaty. Secondly, the Allies had committed themselves in the Armistice agreement to critical principles regarding reparations, territorial adjustments, and evenhandedness in economic matters, which were materially breached by the treaty.

Keynes reviews the facts whereby the Armistice was based on acceptance by the Allies and Germany of Wilson's Fourteen Points and other terms referred to in making the Armistice.

On 5 October 1918 the German government addressed a brief Note to the President accepting the Fourteen Points and asking for peace negotiations. The President's reply of 8 October asked if he was to understand definitely that the German government accepted 'the terms laid down' in the Fourteen Points and in his subsequent addresses and 'that its object in entering into discussion would be only to agree upon the practical details of their application.' He added that the evacuation of invaded territory must be a prior condition of an armistice. On 12 October the German government returned an unconditional affirmative to these questions; 'its object in entering into discussions would be only to agree upon practical details of the application of these terms'. ... The nature of the contract between Germany and the Allies resulting from this exchange of documents is plain and unequivocal. The terms of the peace are to be in accordance with the addresses of the President, and the purpose of the peace conference is 'to discuss the details of their application.' The circumstances of the contract were of an unusually solemn and binding character; for one of the conditions of it was that Germany should agree to armistice terms which were to be such as would leave her helpless. Germany having rendered herself helpless in reliance on the contract, the honour of the Allies was peculiarly involved in fulfilling their part and, if there were ambiguities, in not using their position to take advantage of them.

Keynes summarises the most important aspects of the Fourteen Points and other addresses by Wilson that were part of the Armistice agreement.

The Fourteen Points – (3) 'The removal, so far as possible, of all economic barriers and the establishment of an equality of trade conditions among all the nations consenting to the peace and associating themselves for its maintenance.' (4) 'Adequate guarantees given and taken that national armaments will be reduced to the lowest point consistent with domestic safety.' (5) 'A free, open-minded, and absolutely impartial adjustment of all colonial claims', regard being had to the interests of the populations concerned. (6), (7), (8), and (11) The evacuation and 'restoration' of all invaded territory, especially of Belgium. To this must be added the rider of the Allies, claiming compensation for all damage done to civilians and their property by land, by sea, and from the air (quoted in full above). (8) The righting of 'the wrong done to France by Prussia in 1871 in the matter of Alsace-Lorraine'. (13) An independent Poland, including 'the territories inhabited by indisputably Polish populations' and 'assured a free and secure access to the sea'. (14) The League of Nations.

Before the Congress, 11 February – 'There shall be no annexations, no contributions, no punitive damages.... Self-determination is not a mere phrase. It is an imperative principle of action which statesmen will henceforth ignore at their peril.... Every territorial settlement involved in this war must be made in the interest and for the benefit of the populations concerned, and not as a part of any mere adjustment or compromise of claims amongst rival States.'

New York, 27 September – (1) 'The impartial justice meted out must involve no discrimination between those to whom we wish to be just and those to whom we do not wish to be just.' (2) 'No special or separate interest of any single nation or any group of nations can be made the basis of any part of the settlement which is not consistent with the common interest of all.' (3) 'There can be no leagues or alliances or special covenants and understandings within the general and common family of the League of Nations.' (4) 'There can be no special selfish economic combinations within the League and no employment of any form of economic boycott or exclusion, except as the power of economic penalty by exclusion from the markets of the world may be vested in the League of Nations itself as a means of discipline and control.' (5) 'All international agreements and treaties of every kind must be made known in their entirety to the rest of the world.'

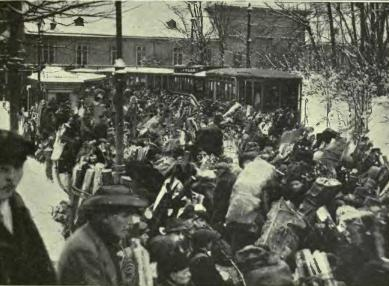
Poor collecting wood in the Vienna Woods and waiting for the trams to return to Vienna, winter of 1919–1920

Keynes points to the material violation of the terms regarding reparations, territorial adjustments, and an equitable economic settlement as a blot on the honour of the western allies and a primary cause of a future war. Given that he was writing in 1919, his prediction that the next war would begin twenty years hence had an uncanny accuracy.

=== Europe ===
One of the most serious charges Keynes levelled against the Treaty and the men who created it is that it paid almost no attention whatever to the economic future of Europe:

The Treaty includes no provisions for the economic rehabilitation of Europe,– nothing to make the defeated Central Powers into good neighbors, nothing to stabilize the new states of Europe, nothing to reclaim Russia; nor does it promote in any way a compact of solidarity amongst the Allies themselves; no arrangement was reached at Paris for restoring the disordered finances of France and Italy, or to adjust the systems of the Old World and the New.

The Council of Four paid no attention to these issues, being preoccupied with others,– Clemenceau to crush the economic life of his enemy, Lloyd George to do a deal and bring home something that would pass muster for a week, the President to do nothing that was not just and right. It is an extraordinary fact that the fundamental economic problems of a Europe starving and disintegrating before their eyes, was the one question in which it was impossible to arouse the interest of the Four. Reparation was their main excursion into the economic field, and they settled it as a problem of theology, of politics, of electoral chicane, from every point of view except that of the economic future of the States whose destiny they were handling.

Keynes predicted the causes of high inflation and economic stagnation in postwar Europe:

Lenin is said to have declared that the best way to destroy the Capitalist System was to debauch the currency. By a continuing process of inflation, governments can confiscate, secretly and unobserved, an important part of the wealth of their citizens. By this method they not only confiscate, but they confiscate arbitrarily; and, while the process impoverishes many, it actually enriches some. The sight of this arbitrary rearrangement of riches strikes not only at security, but at confidence in the equity of the existing distribution of wealth. ... Lenin was certainly right. There is no subtler, no surer means of overturning the existing basis of society than to debauch the currency. The process engages all the hidden forces of economic law on the side of destruction, and does it in a manner which not one man in a million is able to diagnose.

He explicitly pointed out the relationship between governments printing money and inflation:

The inflationism of the currency systems of Europe has proceeded to extraordinary lengths. The various belligerent Governments, unable, or too timid or too short-sighted to secure from loans or taxes the resources they required, have printed notes for the balance.

Keynes also pointed out how government price controls discourage production:

The presumption of a spurious value for the currency, by the force of law expressed in the regulation of prices, contains in itself, however, the seeds of final economic decay, and soon dries up the sources of ultimate supply. If a man is compelled to exchange the fruits of his labors for paper which, as experience soon teaches him, he cannot use to purchase what he requires at a price comparable to that which he has received for his own products, he will keep his produce for himself, dispose of it to his friends and neighbors as a favor, or relax his efforts in producing it. A system of compelling the exchange of commodities at what is not their real relative value not only relaxes production, but leads finally to the waste and inefficiency of barter.

The Economic Consequences of the Peace detailed the relationship between German government deficits and inflation:

In Germany the total expenditure of the Empire, the Federal States, and the Communes in 1919–20 is estimated at 25 milliards of marks, of which not above 10 milliards are covered by previously existing taxation. This is without allowing anything for the payment of the indemnity. In Russia, Poland, Hungary, or Austria such a thing as a budget cannot be seriously considered to exist at all. ... Thus the menace of inflationism described above is not merely a product of the war, of which peace begins the cure. It is a continuing phenomenon of which the end is not yet in sight.

Keynes ended with this ominous warning:

Economic privation proceeds by easy stages, and so long as men suffer it patiently the outside world cares very little. Physical efficiency and resistance to disease slowly diminish, but life proceeds somehow, until the limit of human endurance is reached at last and counsels of despair and madness stir the sufferers from the lethargy which precedes the crisis. The man shakes himself, and the bonds of custom are loosed. The power of ideas is sovereign, and he listens to whatever instruction of hope, illusion, or revenge is carried to them in the air. ... But who can say how much is endurable, or in what direction men will seek at last to escape from their misfortunes?

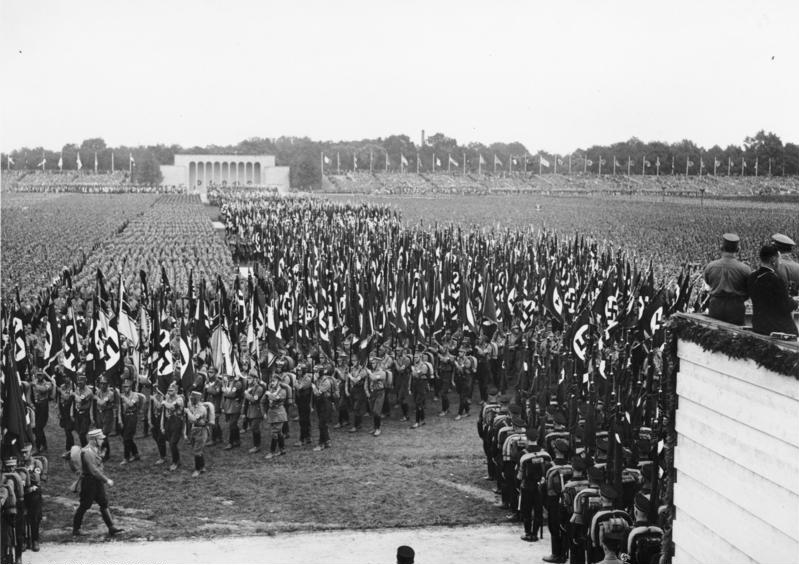
The Nazi Party rally at Nuremberg in 1933

Not too many years later. Adolf Hitler was to write in Mein Kampf:

What a use could be made of the Treaty of Versailles. ... How each one of the points of that treaty could be branded in the minds and hearts of the German people until sixty million men and women find their souls aflame with a feeling of rage and shame; and a torrent of fire bursts forth as from a furnace, and a will of steel is forged from it, with the common cry: "We will have arms again!"

Samuel W. Mitcham comments:

Niccolò Machiavelli advised the prince to never inflict small hurts. This is exactly what the Allies did with the armistice and the Treaty of Versailles. The German people were humiliated, and their faith in democracy – which was fragile to begin with – was almost totally destroyed. However, they were not annihilated. ... The Allies should have either totally destroyed and dismembered Germany or else have made a sincere effort to make a fair and just peace with her and bring her into the family of nations as a full partner. But doing neither, they set the stage for Adolf Hitler and the Second World War. In my view, it is not going too far to state that the Nazi dictator should have worn a stamp on the seat of his pants with three words on it: "Made at Versailles."

=== Remedies ===
Keynes makes many practical suggestions. These informed the settlements after World War II. More abstractly, he says in conclusion:

We may still have time to reconsider our courses and to view the world with new eyes. For the immediate future events are taking charge, and the near destiny of Europe is no longer in the hands of any man. The events of the coming year will not be shaped by the deliberate acts of statesmen, but by the hidden currents, flowing continually beneath the surface of political history, of which no one can predict the outcome. In one way only can we influence these hidden currents,—by setting in motion those forces of instruction and imagination which change opinion. The assertion of truth, the unveiling of illusion, the dissipation of hate, the enlargement and instruction of men's hearts and minds, must be the means.

His next book was his Treatise.

== German influence on Keynes ==
While at Versailles, Keynes had a series of meetings with Carl Melchior of Max Warburg's bank in Hamburg. Melchior was a lawyer and one of the German representatives at the peace conference. Through Melchior, Keynes received a dire picture of the social and economic state of Germany at the time, which he portrayed as being ripe for a Communist revolution. Keynes accepted this representation, and parts of the text of The Economic Consequences roughly parallel the language of the German counter-proposals to the draft Allied proposal of terms.

According to historian Niall Ferguson:

To say that Keynes's argument in the book was the same as that put forward by German financial experts at the conference would be to exaggerate. But the resemblances are very close; nor did Keynes deny their influence on him. Like them, he blamed the French for the 'Carthaginian' economic provisions of the Treaty and denounced the Reparations Commission as 'an instrument of oppression and rapine'. Like them, he insisted that Germany 'had not surrendered unconditionally, but on agreed terms as to the general character of the peace' {the Fourteen Points and subsequent American notes}. And like them, he stressed that the loss of Germany's merchant marine, her overseas assets, her coal-rich territories and her sovereignty in matters of trade policy severely limited her capacity to pay reparations. ... Nor did Keynes omit the apocalyptic warnings he had heard from Melchior at Versailles, predicting a Malthusian crisis in Germany, and the destruction of capitalism in Central Europe...

Keynes himself characterized the German counter-proposals as "somewhat obscure, and also rather disingenuous."

[The German negotiators] assumed ... that [the Allied negotiators] were secretly as anxious as the Germans themselves to arrive at a settlement which bore some relation to the facts, and that they would therefore be willing, in view of the entanglements which they had gotten themselves into with their own publics [in promising that "Germany will pay"], to practice a little collusion in drafting the Treaty,– a supposition which in slightly different circumstances might have had a good deal of foundation. As matters actually were, this subtlety did not benefit them, and they would have done much better with a straightforward and candid estimate of what they believed to be the amount of their liabilities on the one hand, and their capacity to pay on the other.

In addition to his meetings in Versailles, at the invitation of Max Warburg's brother Paul Warburg, Keynes attended an Amsterdam conference of bankers and economists in October 1919, and he drafted there with Paul Warburg a memorandum of appeal to the League of Nations calling for a reduction in German reparations.

== Success ==
Keynes' book was released in late 1919 and was an immediate success: it became a bestseller on both sides of the Atlantic: it was released in the United States in 1920. The scathing sketches of Wilson, Lloyd George and Clemenceau proved to be very popular and the work established Keynes' reputation with the public as a leading economist. In six months, the book had sold 100,000 copies worldwide, with translations into 12 languages. It restored Keynes' reputation with the Bloomsbury Group, which had been tarnished by his work for the Treasury during the war. Keynes returned to Cambridge to work as an economist, where he was regarded as the leading student of Alfred Marshall.

Keynes on The Council of Four

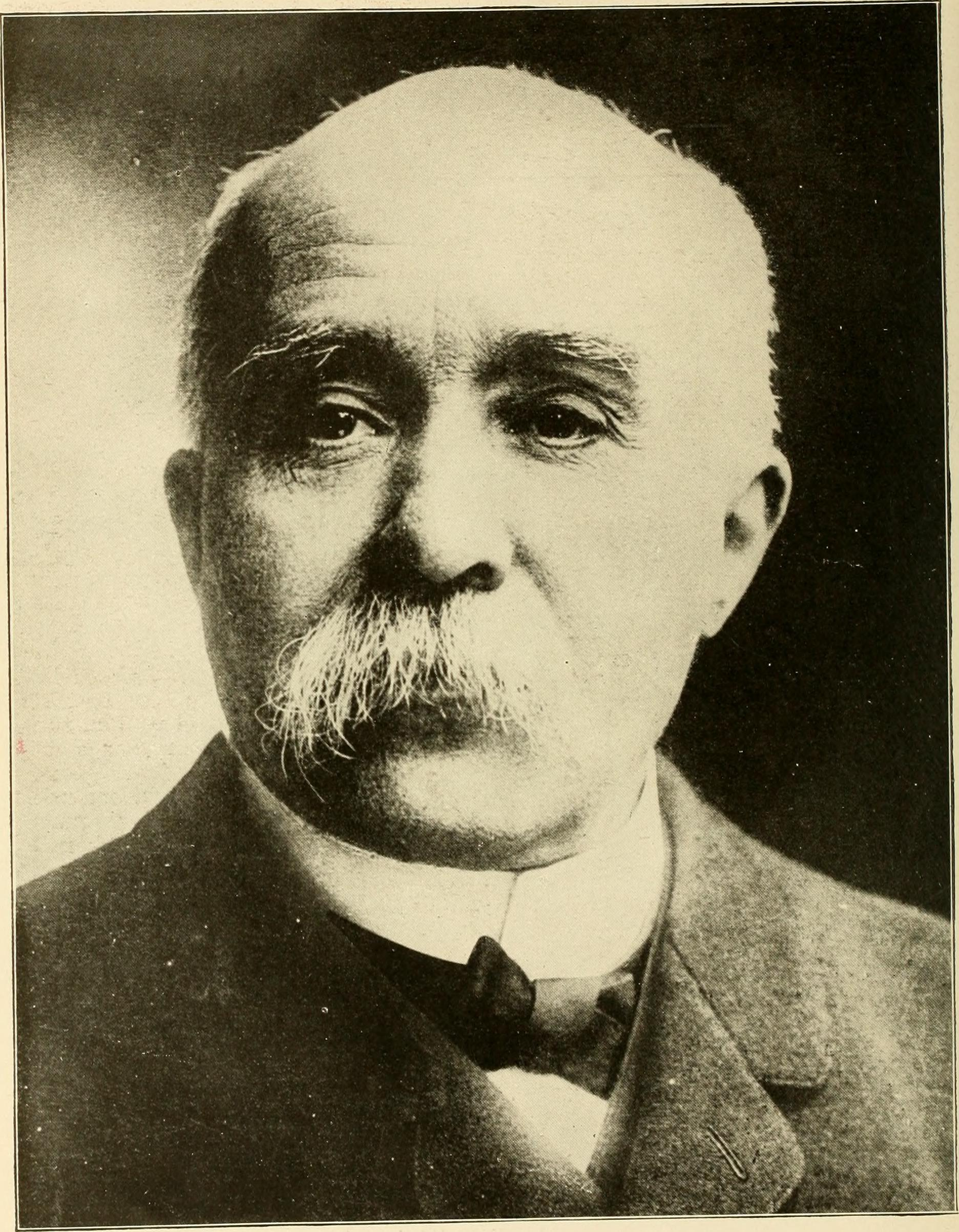
Georges Clemenceau,
Premier of France
"...a foremost believer in the view of German psychology that the German understands and can understand nothing but intimidation, that he is without generosity or remorse in negotiation, that there is no advantage he will not take of you, and no extent to which he will not demean himself for profit, that he is without honor, pride, or mercy. Therefore you must never negotiate with a German or conciliate him; you must dictate to him."

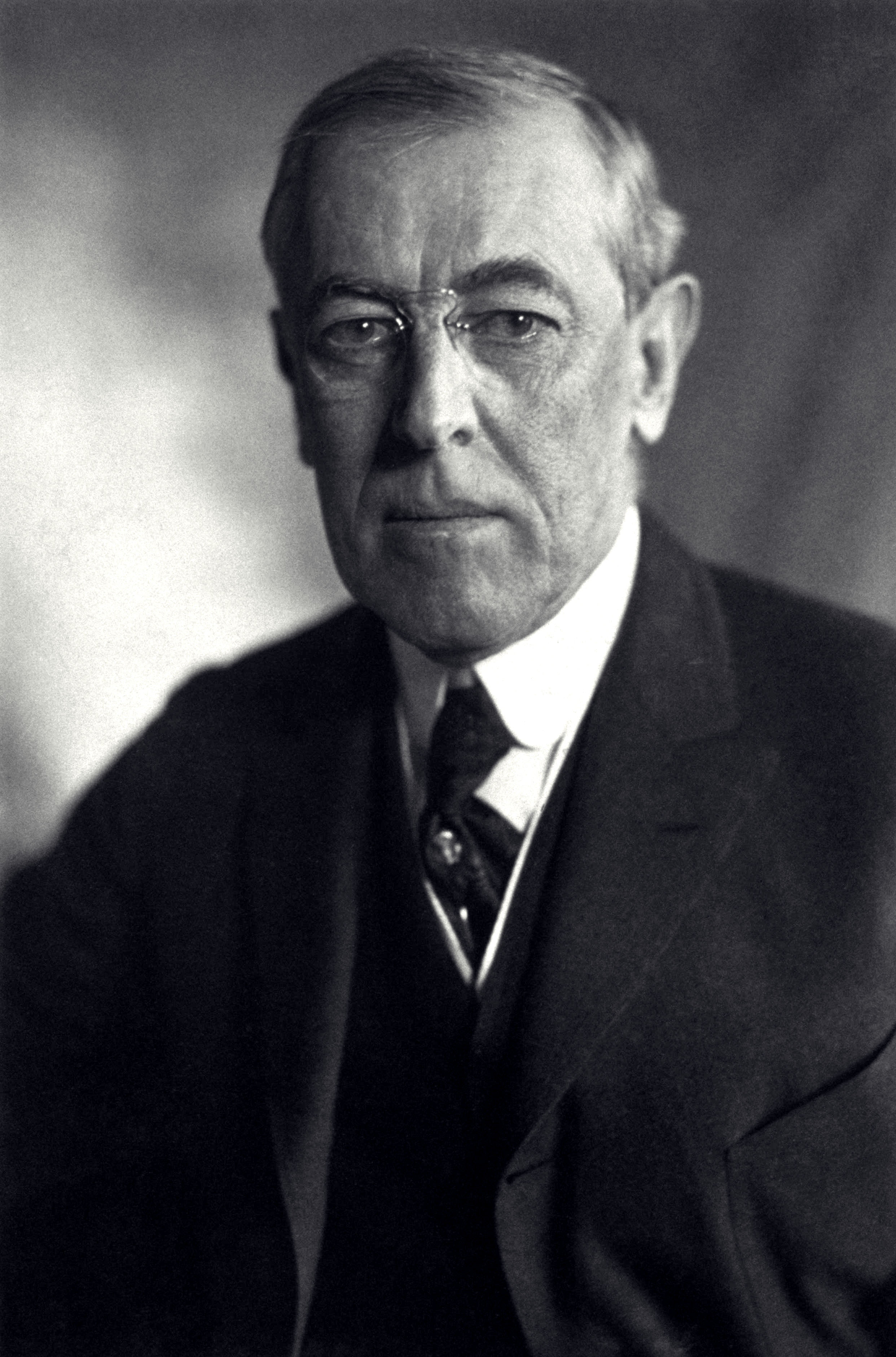
Woodrow Wilson,
President of the United States
"[I]f ever the action of a single individual matters, the collapse of The President has been one of the decisive moral events of history. ... He had no plan, no scheme, no constructive ideas whatever for clothing with the flesh of life the commandments which he had thundered from the White House. ... [N]ot only was he ill-informed, but his mind was slow and unadaptable ... There can seldom have been a statesman of the first rank more incompetent than the President in the agilities of the council chamber."

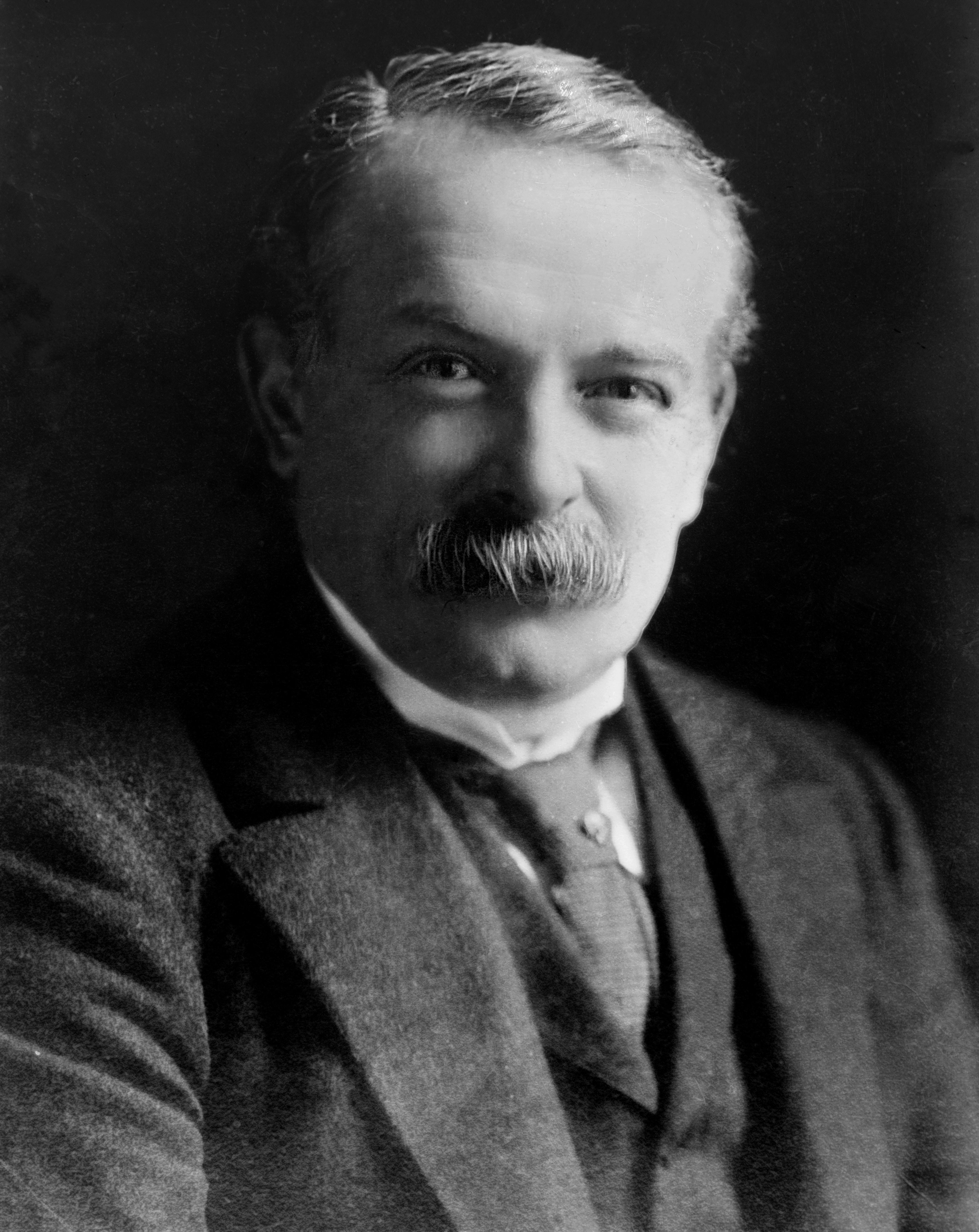
David Lloyd George,
Prime Minister of the United Kingdom
"[he had an] unerring, almost medium-like sensibility to every one around him ... watching the company, with six or seven senses not available to ordinary men, judging character, motive, and subsconscious impulse, perceiving what each [man] was thinking and even what each was going to say next, and compounding with telepathic instinct the argument or appeal that best suited the vanity, weakness, or self-interest of his auditor..."

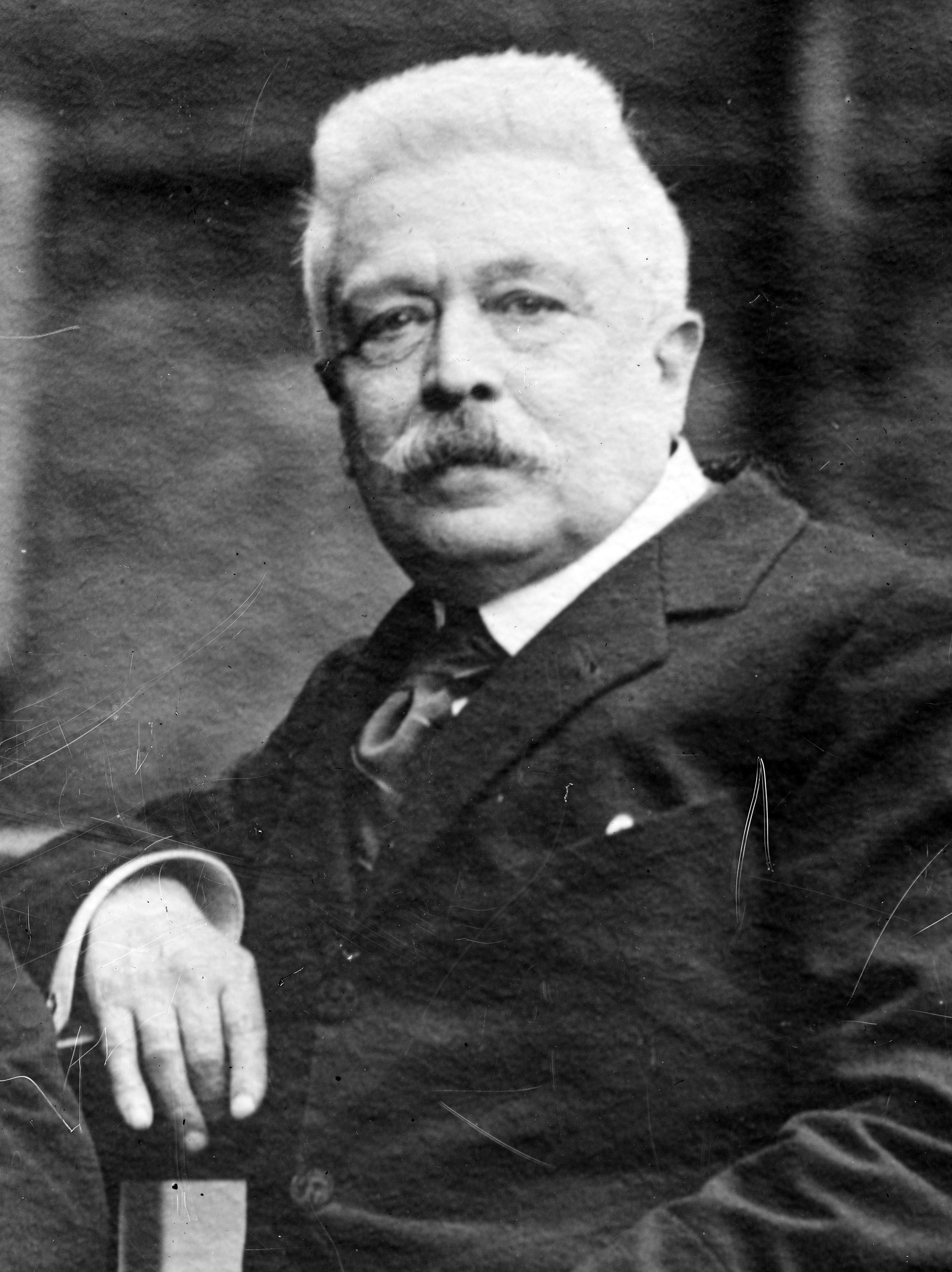
Vittorio Emanuele Orlando,
Prime Minister of Italy
"[Clemenceau] alone amongst the Four could speak and understand both languages [that is, French and English], Orlando knowing only French and the Prime Minister and President only English; and it is of historical importance that Orlando and the President had no direct means of communication."

== Impact in the United States ==
As well as being highly successful in commercial terms in the US, the book proved to be highly influential. The book was released just before the US Senate considered the treaty and confirmed the beliefs of the "irreconcilables" against American participation in the League of Nations. As well, the book also heightened the doubts of the "reservationists", led by Henry Cabot Lodge, over the terms of the treaty and created doubts in the minds of Wilson's supporters. Lodge, the Republican Senate leader, shared Keynes' concerns about the severity of the treaty on Germany and believed that it would have to be renegotiated in the future. Keynes played a critical role in turning American public opinion against the treaty of Versailles and the League of Nations, but it was Wilson's poor management of the issue and a number of strokes he had that would be decisive: America would not participate in the League of Nations.

== Impact in the United Kingdom ==
Keynes' portrayal of the treaty as a "Carthaginian peace" – a brutal peace which has the intent of crushing the losing side – quickly became the orthodoxy in academic circles and was a common opinion amongst the British public. It was widely believed in Britain that the terms of the treaty were unfair. That was influential in determining a response to the attempts by Adolf Hitler to overturn the Versailles Treaty especially in the period leading up to the Munich Agreement. In Germany, the book confirmed what the overwhelming majority of the people already believed: the unfairness of the treaty. France was reluctant to use armed force to enforce the treaty without the support of the British Government. Prior to late 1938, the strength of public opposition to prospective involvement in another war meant that British support for the French position was unreliable.

== Reception ==
The French economist Étienne Mantoux criticised the impact of Keynes' book in his book The Carthaginian Peace: or the Economic Consequences of Mr. Keynes by saying that it did more than any other writing to discredit the Treaty of Versailles. Mantoux compared The Economic Consequences of the Peace to Edmund Burke's Reflections on the Revolution in France because of the immediate influence on public opinion. Mantoux sought to discredit Keynes' predictions of what the consequences of the Treaty would be. For example, Keynes believed European output in iron would decrease, but by 1929, iron output in Europe was up 10% from the 1913 figure. Keynes predicted that German iron and steel output would decrease, but by 1927, steel output had increased by 30% and iron output increased by 38% from 1913 (within the pre-war borders). Keynes also argued that German coal mining efficiency would decrease, but labour efficiency by 1929 had increased on the 1913 figure by 30%. Keynes contended that Germany would be unable to export coal immediately, but German net coal exports had grown to 15 million tons within a year and by 1926 the tonnage exported had reached 35 million. Keynes also claimed that German national savings in the years after the treaty would be less than 2 billion marks: however, in 1925, the German national savings figure was estimated at 6.4 billion marks and, in 1927, 7.6 billion marks.

Keynes also believed that Germany would be unable to pay the more than 2 billion marks in reparations for the next 30 years, but Mantoux contends that German rearmament spending was seven times as much as that figure in each year between 1933 and 1939. René Albrecht-Carrié in 1965 claimed that Weimar Germany, well before Hitler secretly began to rebuild the German military, could not keep up its reparations payments, which were renegotiated several times, and were later the subject of several reorganizational schemes such as the Dawes Plan and the Young Plan. He also argued that reparation payments and other requirements of the Treaty crippled the German economy, a view shared by the British, who proposed in 1922 the cancellation of all reparations and debts arising from the war – including Allied debts to the United States (Note: The UK was overall a creditor nation in relation to World War I, so the proposal was not, as it may first appear, self-serving.) – a proposal which did not find favour in France or the US. However, the historian Sally Marks, writing in 2013, claimed that Germany had the financial capacity to pay reparations. She also showed, based on research in the archives, that Germany paid only minimal cash reparations during the period 1921–1923 and that "it is hard to conceive that something that was not happening or that was occurring only minimally could have caused all that is often attributed to reparations, including the great inflation".

The breakdown of the German economy brought great distress to the German people, which caused them to lose the minimal faith in democracy they possessed, and made them more sympathetic to the appeals of Hitler and the Nazi Party, for whom the overthrow of the "dictat" of Versailles was a primary goal. When the economy rebounded, and foreign loans – especially from the United States – became available to Germany, the Weimar government compounded the problems by borrowing prodigious amounts, even using funds from foreign loans to pay their reparations. Then, when Wall Street crashed in 1929, the Great Depression began and precipitated a period of deep unemployment.

The historian A. J. P. Taylor has written:

The war, far from weakening economic resources, stimulated them too much. The most serious blow inflicted by the war economically was to men's minds, not to their productive powers. The old order of financial stability was shaken, never to be restored. Depreciated currencies, reparations, war debts, were the great shadows of the inter-war period – all imaginary things, divorced from the realities of mine and factory.

Taylor also claimed that Mantoux's book refuted Keynes' thesis. Albrecht-Carrié in 1965 argued that Keynes was overall prescient in his long-term analysis of the impact of the Treaty.

The historian Ruth Henig wrote in 1995 that "most historians of the Paris peace conference now take the view that, in economic terms, the treaty was not unduly harsh on Germany and that, while obligations and damages were inevitably much stressed in the debates at Paris to satisfy electors reading the daily newspapers, the intention was quietly to give Germany substantial help towards paying her bills, and to meet many of the German objections by amendments to the way the reparations schedule was in practice carried out". Sally Marks claimed in 2013 that for "nearly forty years, historians of twentieth-century diplomacy have argued that the Versailles treaty was more reasonable than its reputation suggests and that it did not of itself cause the Depression, the rise of Hitler, or World War II". Marks also claimed that Keynes' book was a "brilliant but warped polemic" that is "long discredited by scholars" and which Keynes regretted writing.

Some scholars have portrayed the Treaty as less harsh than it was seen to be in the immediate aftermath of the Paris Peace Conference. Gideon Rose, for instance, sees it as "more balanced" than it seemed at the time, and "a mixture of discordant elements that was neither Carthaginian nor Metternichian", while Max Hastings calls the peace treaty "clumsy" but writes that "[I]f the Germans had instead been dictating the terms as victors, European freedom, justice and democracy would have paid a dreadful forfeit". David Stevenson argues that neither the Armistice nor the Peace Treaty made World War II inevitable – as claimed by many scholars – and that "the peacemakers have had an undeservedly bad press. ... [T]hey were feeling their way in unprecedented circumstances, but the settlement that was constructed was more flexible than its critics acknowledged, and could either have accommodated a lasting reconciliation with the new Republican regime in Germany or ensured that it remained militarily harmless. The real tragedy of the inter-war years is that it did neither... The Treaty could have stopped another bloodbath if it had been upheld." This, of course, is antithetical to the arguments of Keynes, or at least his followers, who draw a direct line between the economic conditions created by the Peace Treaty and the rise of belligerent regimes in Europe. For his part, revisionist historian Niall Ferguson is another who does not share the view that the Treaty of Versailles was punitive and an economic disaster:

In reality, the peace terms were not unprecedented in their harshness, and the German hyperinflation was mainly due to the irresponsible fiscal and monetary policies adopted by the Germans themselves. They thought they could win the peace by economic means. In British minds they did. The Germans were also more successful than any other country in defaulting on their debts, including the reparations demanded from them by the Allies. However, this victory was pyrrhic: it was won by democratic politicians at the expense of democracy and their own power.

In the 1920s, the influential Swedish economists David Davidson, Gustav Cassel and Eli Heckscher endorsed Keynes's book.

The book has been a subject of ongoing scholarship. In 2019, a conference was held to mark the centenary of its publication at King's College, Cambridge. In 2024, a book edited by Patricia Clavin, Giancarlo Corsetti, Adam Tooze, and Maurice Obstfeld was published, arguing that despite being laser focused on issues current back in 1919, The Economic Consequences of the Peace remains relevant. They argue this is in part due to Keynes's central theme having been the contest between "myopic nationalism" versu "peaceful economic integration", a topic that has become more pressing with recent developments. The 2024 work noted that Keynes's book was described by his first biographer as "a work of art", and by his then latest biographer as "a landmark of political theory and one of the most emotionally compelling works of economic literature ever written". The 2024 work also notes that the overall highly favourable economic reception enjoyed by Consequences was due in part to its professional and thought-provoking nature, which "generated a broad-based alliance of the initiated across the spectrum".

== See also ==
- The Big Four (World War I)
- Paris Peace Conference, 1919
- Treaty of Versailles
- World War I reparations
