= The Scandinavian Journal of Economics =

- Discipline: Economics
- Language: English
- Edited by: Torfinn Harding, Kristoffer Nimark, Erik Wengström, Miriam Wüst

Publication details
- Former names: Ekonomisk Tidskrift (1899–1964), The Swedish Journal of Economics (1965–1975)
- History: 1899–present
- Publisher: Wiley-Blackwell
- Frequency: Quarterly
- Impact factor: 1.696 (2020)

Standard abbreviations
- ISO 4: Scand. J. Econ.

Indexing
- ISSN: 0347-0520 (print); 1467-9442 (web)
- LCCN: 76645314
- JSTOR: 03470520
- OCLC no.: 2328521

Links
- Journal homepage; Online submission

The Scandinavian Journal of Economics was established as the Ekonomisk Tidskrift (in Swedish) in 1899 by David Davidson. It became The Swedish Journal of Economics in 1965 (in English) and then The Scandinavian Journal of Economics in 1976. Davidson was the editor until his retirement in 1939 at the age of 85, having run it virtually as a one-man operation.

In its early history all articles were written in Swedish. The first article in English was printed in 1947. The journal published many important works by Gustaf Cassel, Knut Wicksell, Eli Heckscher, Gunnar Myrdal, and Erik Lindahl. It is owned by a non-profit association and published on its behalf by Wiley-Blackwell.

According to the Journal Citation Reports, the journal has a 2020 impact factor of 1.696.
