= Pierre-Paul Schweitzer =

French businessman

Managing Director of the International Monetary Fund
- In office 1 September 1963 – 31 August 1973
- Preceded by: Per Jacobsson
- Succeeded by: Johan Witteveen

Personal details
- Born: 29 May 1912 Strasbourg, Alsace-Lorraine, German Empire
- Died: 2 January 1994 (aged 81) Geneva, Switzerland
- Children: Louis Schweitzer
- Education: University of Paris; Sciences Po
- Profession: Lawyer

Pierre-Paul Schweitzer (French pronunciation: [pjɛʁpol ʃwɛtse]; 29 May 1912 – 2 January 1994) was a French businessman who served as the fourth managing director of the International Monetary Fund (IMF) from 1963 to 1973.

== Early life and education ==
He was born on 29 May 1912, in Straßburg, Elsaß-Lothringen, German Empire. He is the father of Louis Schweitzer, CEO of Renault. He was the nephew of Albert Schweitzer.

Schweitzer was educated at the University of Strasbourg, the University of Paris, and the Paris School of Political Science (Sciences Po) and received degrees in law, economics, and political science.

== Career ==
In his early career, Schweitzer joined the French Government as an assistant Inspecteur des Finances (1936), before becoming an Inspecteur des Finances (1939). Then he was: deputy director for the department of external finance of the French Treasury (1946); alternate executive director for France at the IMF (1947); secretary of the French Interministerial Committee in Charge of Questions on European Economic Cooperation (1948); financial attaché at the French embassy in Washington (1949–1953); director of the French Treasury (1953–1960). In 1960, he was appointed deputy governor of the Bank of France. He also served as a director of the European Investment Bank, a director of Air France, and as a government commissioner on the boards of the French Petroleum Company and the French Refinery Company.

On 21 June 1963 Schweitzer was appointed managing director and chairman of the executive board of the IMF, and he assumed his duties on 1 September 1963. Schweitzer was appointed to a second five-year term as managing director and chairman of the board of the IMF on 15 May 1968.

Schweitzer's term as the IMF's managing director was a critical period, not only due to the collapse of the Par Value System, but also for the creation of the special drawing rights (SDR), as an international reserve asset (1968); the establishment of the two-tier gold market, and the work of the Committee of Twenty of the International Monetary System on reforming the international financial system. Also, during his tenure as managing director of the IMF, its membership grew from 91 to 125 countries.

Schweitzer received many honors and decorations, such as the Commander of the Légion d'Honneur; the Médaille de la Résistance, and the Croix de Guerre. He was elected to the American Philosophical Society in 1972.

Schweitzer died on 2 January 1994 in Geneva, Switzerland.

== Military service ==
Schweitzer was commissioned as a lieutenant in the French Army after the outbreak of World War II. When France fell in 1940, he joined the French Resistance and was later captured and held at the Buchenwald concentration camp, on the outskirts of Weimar, Germany, until it was liberated in 1945. Schweitzer was a Nazi concentration camp survivor.

Civic offices
Preceded by Per Jacobsson	Head of the International Monetary Fund; 1963–1973	Succeeded by Johan Witteveen
