= Louis Schweitzer =

French businessman (1942–2025)

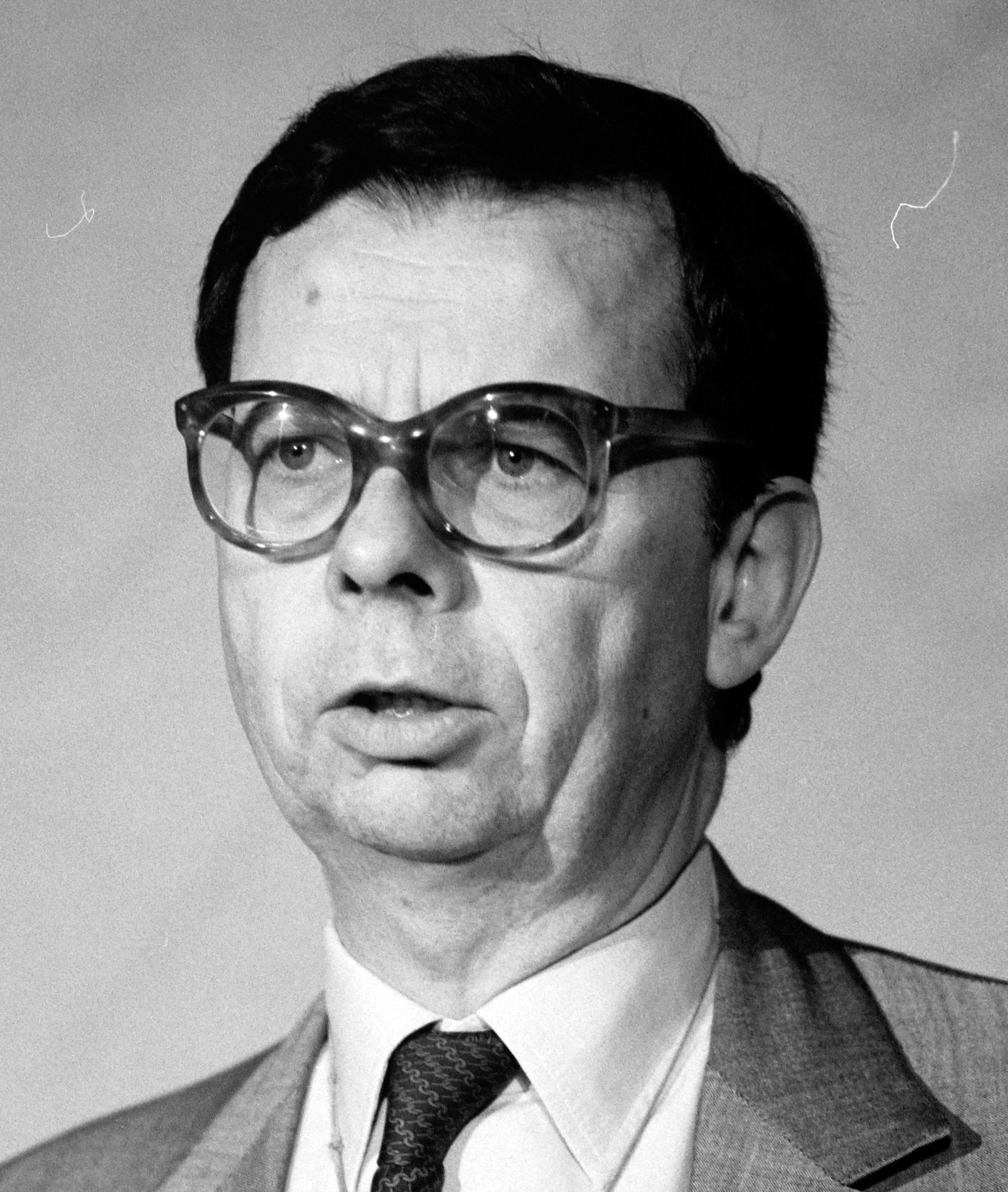
- Schweitzer in 1994
- Born: 8 July 1942; Geneva, Switzerland
- Died: 6 November 2025 (aged 83)
- Education: Institut d'études politiques de Paris
- Occupation: Chairman of Renault (1992–2005)
- Parent: Pierre-Paul Schweitzer
- Awards: Légion d'honneur National Order of Merit

Louis Schweitzer (8 July 1942 – 6 November 2025) was a French businessman who was a chairman of the board of Groupe Renault, first taking the post on 27 May 1992, succeeding Raymond Lévy. He was also CEO from 1992 to 2005. He was in addition Chairman of AstraZeneca until 8 June 2012 where he was appointed a Director on 11 March 2004. He was a non-executive director of BNP Paribas, Electricité de France, Veolia Environnement, Volvo AB and L'Oréal, and Vice-Chairman of the Supervisory Board of Philips Electronics NV.

== Early life and education ==
Schweitzer was the son of Pierre-Paul Schweitzer, Managing Director of the International Monetary Fund (IMF) from 1963 to 1973. He was the grandnephew of Albert Schweitzer, and a relative of Jean-Paul Sartre and the conductor Charles Munch.

Schweitzer had a degree in law and was a graduate of France's elite Institut d'études politiques de Paris (Sciences Po) and École nationale d'administration.

== Career ==
=== Career in the public sector ===
Schweitzer was appointed Inspector of Finance at the French Treasury in 1970. In 1981, he became Chief of Staff to Laurent Fabius in his various government posts (Budget Minister, Minister for Industry and Research and Prime Minister).

=== Career in the private sector ===
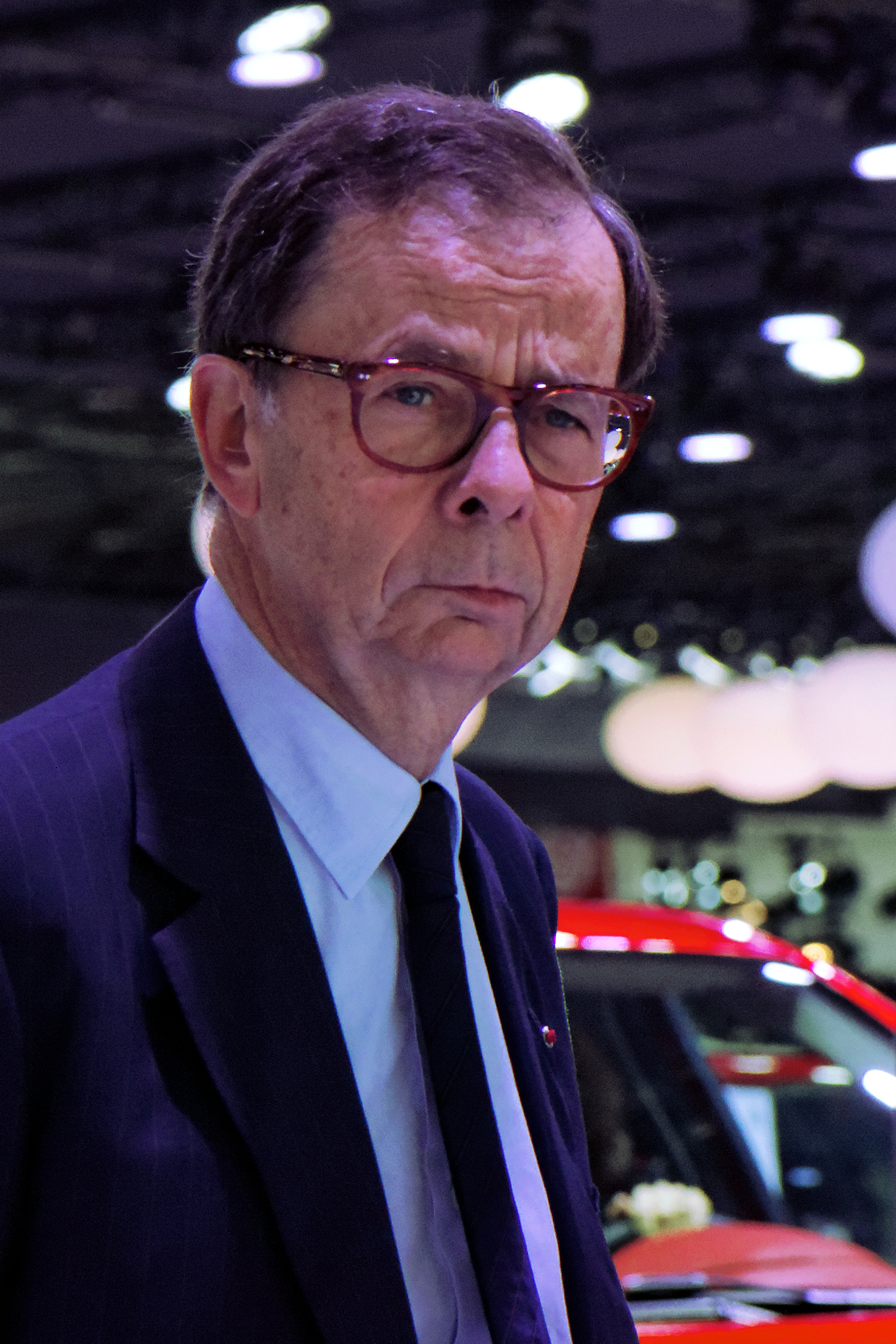
Schweitzer in 2012

Schweitzer joined Renault in 1986 and became Chief Financial Officer and Head of Strategic Planning in 1988.

Schweitzer was appointed Executive Vice President and COO in 1989, and President and COO in 1990. He was Renault's Chairman and CEO from May 1992 to April 2005, and president of the Renault-Nissan Alliance Board from 2001 to 2005. On 29 April 2005, he became Chairman of the Renault Board of Directors.

Schweitzer was a Commander of the French Légion d'honneur and National Order of Merit, and director of several French and foreign companies. He was also member of governing boards of various general organisations, particularly in the cultural field.

From 6 March 2005, Schweitzer has been President of the Haute Autorité de Lutte Contre les Discriminations et Pour l'Égalité. This role was entrusted to him by the French President.

In 2013, he was appointed one of the 250 Grand Officers of the Legion of Honour.

== Other activities ==
- Institut français des relations internationales (Ifri), Vice-President of the Board of Directors
- Paris Europlace, Member of the Board of Directors
- Ashinaga (organization), Chair of the Kenjin–Tatsujin International Advisory Council, the advisory body supporting the Ashinaga Africa Initiative

== Controversy ==
In 1995, the Justice Ministry investigated Schweitzer for being an "accomplice in poisoning" of hemophiliacs. The case stemmed from his tenure as Chief of Staff to Laurent Fabius and whether he knowingly allowed blood infected with HIV to be distributed to recipients. In 2003, the Court of Cassation dismissed the charges against him and several other officials.

Schweitzer was found guilty in 2002 of conducting surveillance on the phone of Jean-Edern Hallier as part of a special unit of the Elysée Palace and fined. The Court of Cassation upheld his conviction in 2008.

== Education ==
- Bachelor of Laws
- Institut d'études politiques de Paris (IEP Paris)
- École nationale d'administration

== Personal life and death ==
Schweitzer was an atheist from a young age, even though he had studied at a Protestant school. He died on 6 November 2025, at the age of 83.

== Renault highlights in the Schweitzer years (1992–2005) ==
- 27 May 1992 – Louis Schweitzer takes over from Raymond Lévy as head of Renault
- December 1992 – Renault wins the Formula One Constructors' and drivers' championships.
- 6 September 1993 – Renault and Volvo sign a merger agreement.
- 2 December 1993 – Volvo pulls out of the merger.
- 18 July 1994 – The Renault privatization bill becomes law. The Régie Nationale des Usines Renault is renamed Renault.
- 13 September 1994 – The French government opens Renault to outside capital
- End-1994 – Renault shares are floated at FRF 180.90. Renault joins the CAC40 index
- 1 June 1995 – Renault decides to open a plant in Brazil.
- 3 July 1996 – Renault is fully privatized, with the French government reducing its stake from 52% to 46%
- 19 November 1996 – Renault Scénic is named European Car of the Year 1997
- December 1996 – Carlos Ghosn is appointed Executive Vice President.
- 27 February 1997 – The closure of the Belgian Vilvoorde plant is announced.
- December 1997 – Williams Renault wins the Formula One Constructors' Championship for the sixth time.
- February 1998 – Renault starts its New Distribution (Nouvelle Distribution) project.
- 28 May 1998 – The Technocentre in Guyancourt, France is opened.
- 2 July 1998 – Renault and the City of Moscow set up OAO Avtoframos.
- November 1998 – Renault starts development work on a car retailing at €5,000.
- 4 December 1998 – Inauguration of the Ayrton Senna Plant in Curitiba Brazil.
- 27 March 1999 – Renault acquires 36.8% of the Japanese carmaker Nissan. Carlos Ghosn becomes head of Nissan.
- 2 July 1999 – Renault takes control of Romanian carmaker Dacia.
- 18 October 1999 – Carlos Ghosn announces the Nissan Revival Plan.
- 21 April 2000 – Renault acquires South Korean carmaker Samsung Motors.
- 25 April 2000 – Renault sells its trucks business to AB Volvo in exchange for a 20% stake in the Swedish group. The future of Renault Trucks is assured.
- 12 March 2001 – Renault and Nissan draw-up plans to set up a global joint purchasing unit, called Renault Nissan Purchasing Organisation
- 27 March 2001 – Laguna II becomes the first car ever to be awarded five stars in the Euro NCAP crash tests
- 30 October 2001 – Renault increases its equity stake in Nissan to 44,4%, and Nissan takes a 15% stake in Renault. The Renault-Nissan Alliance Board is created.
- 20 December 2001 – Renault and Nissan inaugurate their first joint plant, used to assemble LCVs in Curitiba, Brazil.
- 28 June 2002 – Renault and Nissan set up Renault Nissan Information Services, the second joint venture under the Alliance.
- 22 October 2002 – Production of the Trafic panel van starts at Nissan's plant in Barcelona, making Renault and Nissan's first joint production project in Europe.
- 19 November 2002 – Renault Mégane is named Car of the year 2003.
- 23 January 2003 – The Renault Production Way (SPR) is launched with the aim of ensuring that the Group's industrial system performs in line with the best in the world.
- 24 February 2003 – Claas becomes the majority partner in Renault Agriculture by acquiring a 51% stake. (It later purchased the remaining 49%.)
- 26 February 2003 – Renault invests €230 million in the production and marketing of its future X90 vehicle in Russia.
- 28 July 2003 – Renault takes control of its SOMACA subsidiary, previously controlled by the Moroccan government, to make the X90 in Morocco.
- 16 March 2004 – Renault lays the foundations for expansion in Iran by setting up Renault Pars.
- September 2004 – Dacia Logan - the €5,000 car goes on sale
- February 2005 – Renault announces record sales and financial results.
- 22 February 2005 – Renault signs an agreement with Mahindra & Mahindra to produce Logan in India.
- 6 April 2005 – The Avtoframos plant in Moscow is inaugurated.
- 29 April 2005 – Carlos Ghosn takes over from Louis Schweitzer as president of Renault.
