= Tarlok Singh (economist) =

Indian Civil Servant

- Born: 26 February 1913; Gujranwala, British India (now Pakistan)
- Died: 10 December 2005 (aged 92)
- Education: London School of Economics
- Occupations: Economist; civil servant
- Years active: 1937–1974
- Employers: Government of India (1937–1962); UNICEF (1970–1974)
- Known for: Poverty alleviation; resettlement of refugees from Pakistan
- Board member of: Planning Commission of India (1950–1967)
- Awards: Padma Vibhushan (2000); Soderstrom Medal for Economics (1970); Padma Bhushan (1962); Padma Shri (1954)

Tarlok Singh (26 February 1913 – 10 December 2005) was an Indian civil servant and a member of the Planning Commission of India. As an economist and policymaker, Singh was renown his role in the economic regeneration of post-Colonial India.

== Biography ==
Singh studied at London School of Economics under Harold Laski. He served on the Planning Commission of India from its inception in 1950 until his retirement in 1967. He was a member of the Indian Civil Service from 1937 to 1962. He wrote India's first five-year plan; and went on to write an additional three five-year plans.

Singh was also the first Private Secretary to Jawaharlal Nehru, the first Prime Minister of India. He was the Director General of Rehabilitation in the Punjab responsible for the resettlement of refugees and served as the UNICEF Deputy Executive Director (Planning) from 1970 to 1974.

He was the first Chairman of the Indian Association of Social Science Institutions (who sponsor an annual memorial lecture in his name) and was awarded the Padma Vibhushan (2000), the Padma Bhushan (1962) and the Padma Shri in 1954 by the President of India.

Singh was awarded the 1970 Soderstrom Medal for Economics by the Royal Swedish Academy of Science in Stockholm.

His books included Poverty and Social Change, Land Resettlement Manual for Displaced Persons, The Planning Process, Towards an Integrated Society, and India's Development Experience.
