= Ivar Rooth =

Swedish lawyer and economist

Managing Director of the International Monetary Fund
- In office 3 August 1951 – 3 October 1956
- Preceded by: Camille Gutt
- Succeeded by: Per Jacobsson

Governor of the Swedish National Bank
- In office 1929–1948
- Preceded by: Victor Moll
- Succeeded by: Klas Böök

Personal details
- Born: 2 November 1888 Stockholm, Sweden
- Died: 27 February 1972 (aged 83) Lidingö, Sweden
- Education: Uppsala University
- Profession: Lawyer; economist

Ivar Rooth (2 November 1888 – 27 February 1972) was a Swedish lawyer and economist who served as the governor of the Swedish National Bank from 1929 to 1948 and the second managing director of the International Monetary Fund (IMF) from 1951 to 1956. He was also a member of the board of directors of the Bank of International Settlements.

== Career ==
Rooth was born on 2 November 1888, in Stockholm, Sweden. He was the son of Otto Rooth and Ellen Hertzman. He graduated from Uppsala University with a Candidate of Law degree in 1911.

In Rooth's early career, he was Solicitor for the Handelsbank (Commercial Bank) of Stockholm (1914), head of Bank's Commercial Credit Department (1915), Assistant Manager and Solicitor of Stockholm Mortgage Bank, Governor of the Central Bank of Sweden (Sveriges Riksbank, 1929–1948), and Director of the Bank of International Settlements (1931–1933 and 1937–1949). In 1951, he headed a mission to Iraq for the International Bank for Reconstruction and Development. On 10 April 1951, he was appointed managing director and chairman of the executive board of the IMF and assumed his duties on 3 August 1951.

Rooth, in his first address to member countries as managing director of the IMF on 11 September 1951, stated that the Fund "sought removal or modification of exchange restrictions and other discriminatory practices" aimed at a freer flow of international trade and payments. Subsequently, general policy on use of IMF's resources was set forth. This initiated the IMF's policy of drawings in tranches. In 1952, in accordance with the Articles of Agreement, 5 years after the IMF began financial operations, annual consultations with members maintaining exchange restrictions under Article XIV were initiated. The IMF introduced a general framework for Stand-by Arrangements, and the criteria to be applied were standardized. Rooth's term as managing director of the IMF ended on 27 April 1956, but he accepted a request by the executive board to serve a further period ending on 3 October 1956.

Rooth was head of the Investment Committee of the United Nations Pension Fund from 1947 to 1961, and he was also head of the Currency Board in Kuwait from 1960 to 1962. After 1962 he stepped down and lived at Lidingö, Sweden, and occasionally wrote and gave lectures on economic affairs.

== Personal life ==
In 1914, he married Ingrid Lundgren (born 1889), the daughter of Bengt Lundgren and Eva Wennerström. In 1931, he married Ingrid Söderlindh (born 1899), the daughter of Gunnar Söderlindh and Gertrud Lindroth.

He had four children, including physician Gösta Rooth.

Rooth died in Sweden on 27 February 1972.

Government offices
Preceded by Victor Moll	Governor of the Swedish National Bank; 1929–1948	Succeeded by Klas Böök
Civic offices
Preceded by Camille Gutt	Head of the International Monetary Fund; 1951–1956	Succeeded by Per Jacobsson
