= Camille Gutt =

Economist, industrialist, politician (1884-1971)

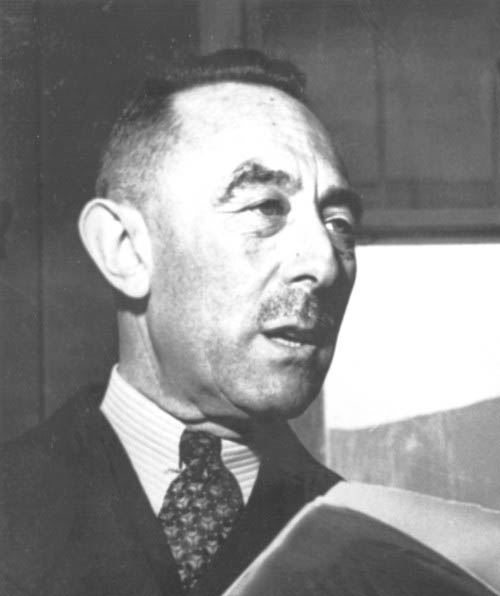
- Gutt in 1944

Managing Director of the International Monetary Fund
- In office 6 May 1946 – 5 May 1951
- Preceded by: Office established
- Succeeded by: Ivar Rooth

Personal details
- Born: Camille Guttenstein; 14 November 1884 Brussels, Belgium
- Died: 7 June 1971 (aged 86) Brussels, Belgium
- Education: Free University of Brussels
- Profession: Lawyer; economist

Camille Gutt (14 November 1884 – 7 June 1971), born Camille Guttenstein, was a Belgian economist, politician, and industrialist who served as the first managing director of the International Monetary Fund (IMF) from 1946 to 1951. He was the architect of a monetary reform plan that facilitated the recovery of the economy of Belgium after the Second World War.

== Early life ==
Born in Brussels, he was a son of Max Guttenstein and Marie-Paule Schweitzer. Max Guttenstein had moved to Belgium from Austria-Hungary in 1877 and became a Belgian citizen in 1886. Camille Gutt attended high school at the Royal Athenaeum in Ixelles. Gutt obtained a PhD in legal studies, and a master's degree in political and social sciences at the Free University of Brussels. During his study, he met Claire Frick, whom he married in 1906. The marriage gave birth to three sons: Jean-Max (1914–1941), François (1916–1944) and Etienne (1922–2011). Gutt was Protestant, although from Jewish origin.

== Career ==
Camille Gutt worked in various industries, such as in the Société Générale de Belgique and Groupe Empain as well as politics. During World War I, Gutt worked for Georges Theunis and again from 1920 until 1924 as his Chief of Cabinet. Later, Gutt also worked for Emile Francqui. Camille Gutt was Minister of Finance of Belgium in 1934–1935 and 1939–1940, Minister of Finance, Economics and Traffic in 1940–1942, Minister of Finance and economics in 1942–1943, and Minister of Finance in 1943–1944 in the Belgian government in exile in London.

Gutt was responsible for saving the Belgian franc before and after World War II. Before the war, he saved the Belgian currency by secretly transferring the gold reserves of the Belgian National Bank out of Nazi reach. After the war, he stabilized the Belgian franc and forestalled inflation, with what still is known as the Gutt operation. Camille Gutt also played a major role in forging the Benelux, and by this contributed to the formation of the European Union. He was the inaugural Managing Director of the International Monetary Fund from 1946 to 1951, after which he was a partner at the Banque Lambert until his retirement in 1964.

== Honours ==
- Belgium: Grand Cordon in the Order of Leopold.
- Netherlands: Knight Grand Cross in the Order of Orange-Nassau.
- Luxemburg: Knight Grand Cross in the Order of the Oak Crown.
- Knight Grand Cross in the Order of Merit.
- France: Grand Officer in the Legion of Honour.

== Selected publications ==
- ——— (1947), "The International Monetary Fund and Its Functions", Proceedings of the Academy of Political Science, 22 (2): 49–56, doi:10.2307/1173022, JSTOR 1173022.
- ——— (1948), "Exchange Rates and the International Monetary Fund", Review of Economics and Statistics, 30 (2): 81–90, doi:10.2307/1928786, JSTOR 1928786.

Civic offices
Preceded by inaugural	Head of the International Monetary Fund; 1946–1951	Succeeded by Ivar Rooth
