= David Davidson (economist) =

Swedish economist

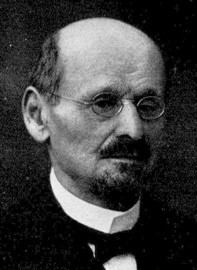
- Born: August 21, 1854; Stockholm, Sweden
- Died: March 18, 1942 (aged 87); Uppsala, Sweden

Academic background
- Influences: David Ricardo

Academic work
- Doctoral students: Eli Heckscher

David Davidson (August 21, 1854 – March 18, 1942) was a Swedish economist. He was professor of economics and taxation law (then still under its former Swedish designation "finance law") at Uppsala University from 1890 to 1919.

He was born to a Jewish family in Stockholm, Sweden.

He founded and edited the journal Ekonomisk Tidskrift (known 1965–1975 as the Swedish Journal of Economics, and since 1976 as the Scandinavian Journal of Economics). Via the journal, Davidson has been credited with switching Swedish economic analysis from one that followed the German Historicist approach to one in which Anglo-American style economic theory played a more dominant role.

His work has been described as Neo-Ricardian. Davidson endorsed John Maynard Keynes's Economic Consequences of the Peace but offered mixed views on Keynes's The General Theory of Employment, Interest and Money.

Davidson was a doctoral advisor to Eli Heckscher.

Davidson was elected a member of the Royal Swedish Academy of Sciences in 1920.

== Major works ==
- The Laws of Capital Formation, 1878.
- Contribution to the History of the Theory of Rent, 1880.

== See also ==
- Davidsonska huset, Gustav Adolfs torg
