= Gustav Cassel =

Swedish economist (1866–1945)

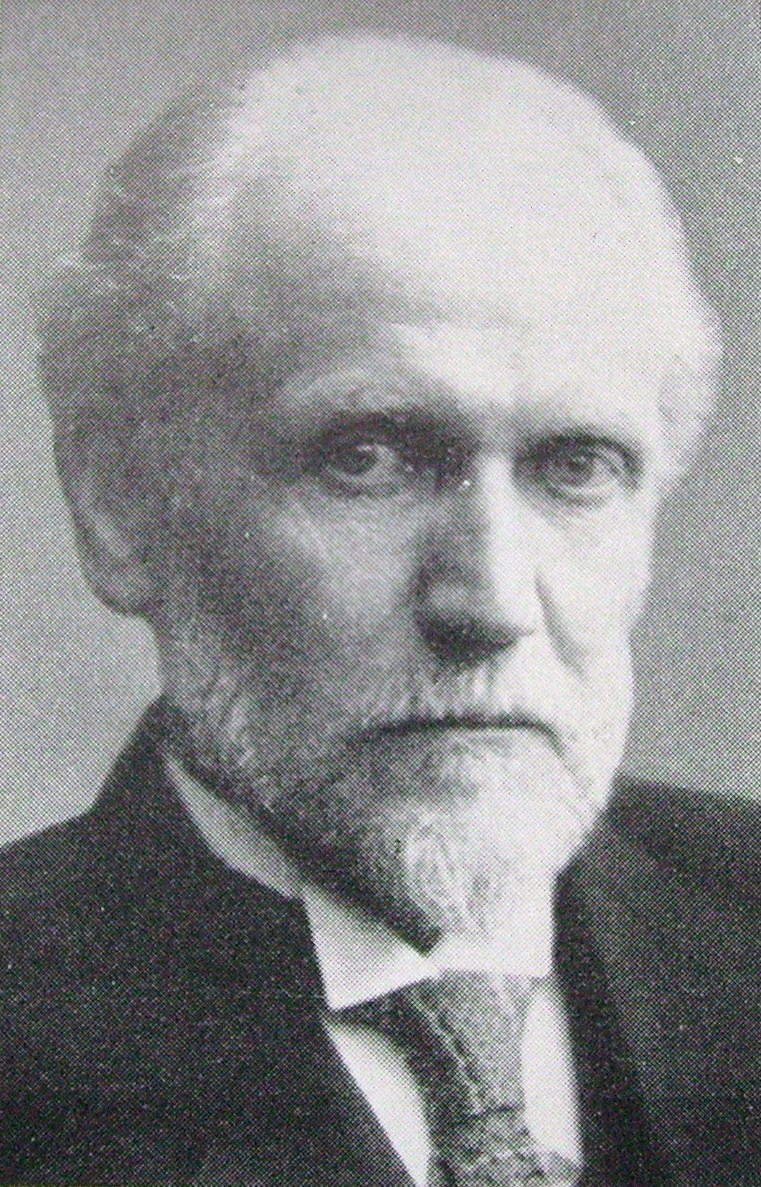
- Born: 20 October 1866; Stockholm
- Died: 14 January 1945 (aged 78); Jönköping

Academic background
- Education: Uppsala University
- Doctoral advisor: Gösta Mittag-Leffler
- Influences: Léon Walras

Academic work
- Discipline: Mathematical economics
- School or tradition: Stockholm School
- Institutions: Stockholm University
- Doctoral students: Gunnar Myrdal; Bertil Ohlin; Eli Heckscher; Gösta Bagge
- Notable ideas: Purchasing power parity, work on interest

Karl Gustav Cassel (20 October 1866 – 14 January 1945) was a Swedish economist and professor of economics at Stockholm University. Cassel was among the most prominent economists in the world in the interwar period. He made contributions to the study of value, monetary policy, and business cycles.

Cassel was influential in Swedish debates about central planning in the early 20th century. Prior to World War I, Cassel held classical liberal views but shifted towards conservative liberalism in the interwar period. Cassel was a leading critic of socialism and state intervention in the economy.

== Early life and education ==
Cassel earned a doctorate in mathematics in 1895. After teaching for two years, he decided to study economics abroad in Germany and England.

== Work ==
Cassel's perspective on economic reality, and especially on the role of interest, was rooted in British neoclassicism and in the nascent Swedish schools. He is perhaps best known through John Maynard Keynes's A Tract on Monetary Reform (1923), in which he raised the idea of purchasing power parity. Cassel endorsed Keynes's book Economic Consequences of the Peace. He also played a role in Keynes's election to the Royal Swedish Academy of Sciences.

"Cassel was beyond doubt one of the outstanding figures in economic science during the inter-war period. His authority was second only to that of Lord Keynes, and his advice was eagerly sought on many occasions by his own Government and by foreign Governments." Lionel Robbins described Cassel in 1926 as "the most distinguished living exponent of analytical economics in Northern Europe." A 1945 obituary of Cassel in the American Economic Review described Cassel as the "dean of Swedish economists."

He was also a founding member of the Swedish school of economics, along with Knut Wicksell and David Davidson. Cassel came to economics from mathematics. He earned an advanced degree in mathematics from Uppsala University and was made professor at Stockholm University during the late 1890s but went to Germany before the turn of the century to study economics, publishing papers spanning just under forty years.

Following the end of WWI Gustav Cassel was actively involved in discussions on possible ways of restoring the gold standard, which would automatically restore the system of fixed exchange rates among participating nations. The stability of exchange rates was widely believed to be crucial for restoring the international trade and for its further stable and balanced growth. The question, which Gustav Cassel tried to answer in his works written in the context of those discussions, was how to determine the appropriate level at which exchange rates were to be fixed during the restoration of the system of fixed exchange rates. His advice was to fix exchange rates at the level corresponding to the purchasing power parity, as he believed that this would prevent trade imbalances between trading nations. PPP doctrine proposed by Cassel was not really a positive theory of exchange rate determination (as Cassel was perfectly aware of numerous factors that prevent exchange rates from stabilizing at PPP level if allowed to float), but rather a normative policy advice, formulated in the context of discussions on returning to the fixed exchange rates system.

He also worked on the German reparations problem. He was a member of many committees dealing with matters of state in Sweden and devoted much labour to the creation of a better system of budget exposition and control (1905–21). He was one of the Swedish representatives at the International Chamber of Commerce meeting in London in 1921. He became a member of Svenska Vetenskapsakademien and correspondent for Sweden to the Royal Economic Society.

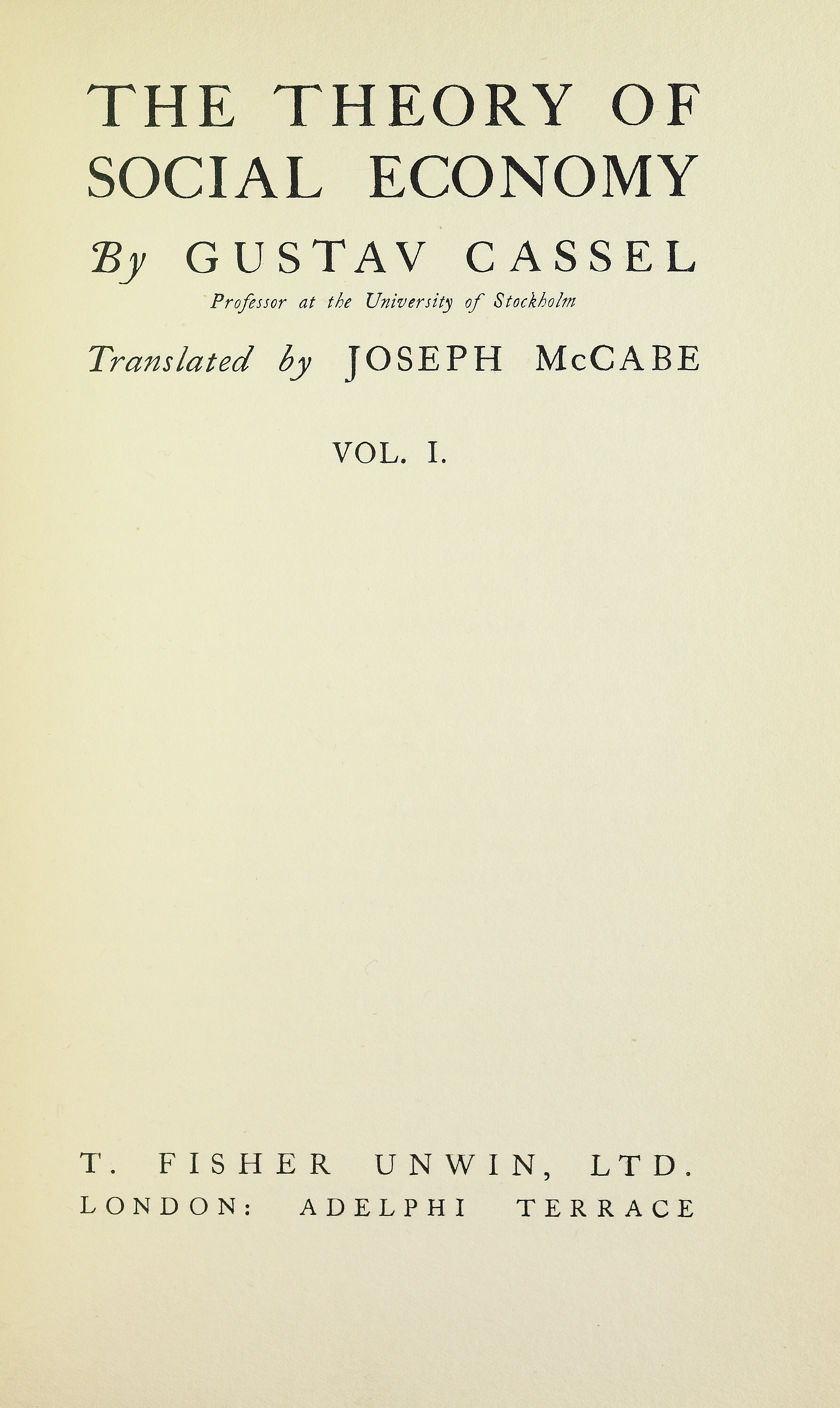
Theoretische Sozialökonomie, 1923

In addition to his books in Swedish, he published the following works in other languages: Das Recht auf den vollen Arbeitsertrag (1900), The Nature and Necessity of Interest (1903), Theoretische Sozialökonomie (1919). His Memorandum on the World's Monetary Problems, published by the League of Nations for the International Financial Conference in Brussels in 1920, attracted widespread attention.

Some of his notable students include Nobel Prize in Economics laureates Bertil Ohlin and Gunnar Myrdal, and the future Moderate Party leader Gösta Bagge.
