= Eli Heckscher =

Swedish political economist and economic historian (1879–1952)

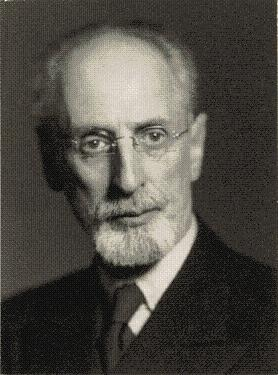
- Born: 24 November 1879; Stockholm
- Died: 23 December 1952 (aged 73); Stockholm

Academic background
- Influences: David Davidson (economist), Gustav Cassel, Alfred Marshall, Knut Wicksell

Eli Filip Heckscher (24 November 1879 – 23 December 1952) was a Swedish political economist and economic historian who was a professor at the Stockholm School of Economics.

He is known for the Heckscher–Ohlin theorem, an influential model of international trade that predicts that capital-abundant countries export capital-intensive goods, while labor-abundant countries export the labor-intensive goods.

== Biography ==
Heckscher was born in Stockholm, son of the Jewish Danish-born businessman Isidor Heckscher and his spouse Rosa Meyer. He completed his secondary education there in 1896.

He conducted higher studies at Uppsala University (from 1897) and at Gothenburg University College (in 1898) before completing his PhD in Uppsala in 1907. At Uppsala, he studied history under Harold Hjarne and economics under David Davidson. After completing his PhD, he lectured at Uppsala.

He was professor of Political economy and Statistics at the Stockholm School of Economics from 1909 until 1919, when he exchanged that chair for a research professorship in economic history, finally retiring as emeritus professor in 1945. In 1929 Heckscher founded the Institute for Economic and Business History Research as a key step in his effort to create the field of economic history in Sweden, and make it a policy-oriented science. He advanced his agenda by recruiting two other scholars, historian Bertil Boëthius (1885–1974) and economist Arthur Montgomery. Thereby the "Stockholm School" emerged and achieved a voice in government planning.

Prior to World War I, Heckscher was a social conservative who advocated for an interventionist state. During World War I, his attitudes shifted, as he became a proponent of economic liberalism and a staunch opponent of state interventionism.

Heckscher is well known for his 1935 book Mercantilism, which was translated into several languages. He is also known for multi-volume An Economic History of Sweden.

Heckscher's most important work, though, is his 1919 article "The Effect of Foreign Trade on the Distribution of Income." In this article, Heckscher provided a model explaining patterns in international trade now known as the (Heckscher–Ohlin model). Heckscher's "The Effect of Foreign Trade on the Distribution of Income" was groundbreaking but originally gained little attention for several reasons. First, Hecksher published the article in the Swedish journal Ekonomisk Tidskrift in Swedish, a language with comparatively less international access. Second, even those reading Swedish and following Hecksher may have overlooked this particular article at first since Heckscher was so prolific (he published 1148 articles and books). Finally, Heckscher was a Jew which was a factor because, just as the significance of the article became apparent beyond Sweden, the rise of anti-Semitism globally and Nazism bans on Jewish authors arguably delayed its greater recognition until after World War II. Heckscher's famous former student Bertil Ohlin at the Stockholm School of Economics (who himself succeeded Heckscher as professor there), significantly expanded on Hecksher's theory, giving it more support and a wider audience. Ohlin won the Nobel Memorial Prize in Economic Sciences in 1977 long after Heckscher's death.

Heckscher was a member of the American Philosophical Society.

== Heckscher–Ohlin theorem ==
The Heckscher–Ohlin Theorem, which is concluded from the Heckscher–Ohlin model of international trade, states: trade between countries is in proportion to their relative amounts of capital and labor. In countries with an abundance of capital, wage rates tend to be high; therefore, labor-intensive products, e.g. textiles, simple electronics, etc., are more costly to produce internally. In contrast, capital-intensive products, e.g. automobiles, chemicals, etc., are less costly to produce internally. Countries with large amounts of capital will export capital-intensive products and import labor-intensive products with the proceeds. Countries with high amounts of labor will do the reverse.

The following conditions must be true:

- The major factors of production, namely labor and capital, are not available in the same proportion in both countries.
- The two goods produced either require more capital or more labor.
- Labor and capital do not move between the two countries.
- There are no costs associated with transporting the goods between countries.
- The citizens of the two trading countries have the same needs.

The theory does not depend on total amounts of capital or labor, but on the amounts per worker. This allows small countries to trade with large countries by specializing in production of products that use the factors which are more available than its trading partner. The key assumption is that capital and labor are not available in the same proportions in the two countries. That leads to specialization, which in turn benefits the country's economic welfare. The greater the difference between the two countries, the greater the gain from specialization.

== Personal life ==
Eli Heckscher's son was Gunnar Heckscher (1909–1987), a political scientist and the leader of what would later become the Swedish Moderate Party 1961–1965. His grandson is the Social Democratic politician Sten Heckscher.

== Sources ==
- Bertil Ohlin, "Heckscher, Eli Filip", Svenskt biografiskt lexikon, vol. 18, pp. 376–381.
